This is a list of fictional monarchs – characters who appear in fiction as the monarchs (kings, queens, emperors, empresses, etc.) of fictional countries. They are listed by country, then according to the production or story in which they appeared.

A

Kingdom of Acorn
The Kingdom of Acorn is featured in the Archie Comics series, Sonic the Hedgehog.

King Maximillian Acorn (also known as King Nigel Acorn) is the rightful ruler of the Kingdom of Acorn and the father of Elias and Sally Acorn.
Elias Acorn becomes the new King of the Kingdom of Acorn after his father's abdication.

Adarlan
King Dorian Havillard, the former crown prince, succeeded his father the previous King of Adarlan in the Throne of Glass novel series by Sarah J. Maas.

Adrestia
Adrestia is an empire in the fictional continent of Fódlan in the video game, Fire Emblem: Three Houses, and its spinoff, Fire Emblem Warriors: Three Hopes.

Emperor Wilhelm Paul Hresvelg
He was the first monarch who along with Saint Seiros of the Church of Seiros (aka Archbishop Rhea) found the Adrestian Empire and raised an army in pursuit of unifying Fódlan, before the evil Nemesis, the King of Liberation, noticed Adrestia's efforts and railed his forces, the Liberation Army, to confront his enemy, thus sparking the War of Heroes. Wilhelm was eventually succeeded by Emperor Lycaon, whose death led the War of Heroes to finally end after the Adrestian Army achieved victory with Seiros slaying Nemesis.
Emperor Ionius von Hresvelg IX (voiced by Paul St. Peter)
He was the previous ruler of Adrestia and the head of House Hresvelg who had multiple empress consorts, including Anselma von Arundel (who later becomes Lady Patricia of Faerghus). During the coup of the Insurrection of the Seven, Ionius lost the power struggle to the Prime Minister, Duke Ludwig von Aegir, and other imperial noble houses and was rendered politically impotent. He even had Lord Volkhard von Arundel, Anselma's brother who returned from Faerghus to Adrestia as its regent, allied himself publicly with Duke Aegir to capture Ionius's children, except one daughter Princess Edelgard, and infuse them with two "Crests" in attempt to create a powerful, peerless emperor.
Empress Edelgard von Hresvelg (voiced by Tara Platt)
Formerly the crown princess and heir apparent, she becomes the crowned "emperor" of Adrestia following her brief reunion with her ailing father Ionius, although many of her siblings had died after being imbued with Crests. Edelgard is also the leader of the Black Eagle House at the Officers Academy and disguises herself under a male persona, called the Flame Emperor, in attempt to overthrow the Church of Seiros and conquer the other nations in Fódlan.

Grand Duchy of Aesfrost
The Grand Duchy of Aesfrost is part of the fictional continent of Norzelia in the video game, Triangle Strategy.

Archduke Zigmunt Aesfrost
He was the previous ruler of the Grand Duchy of Aesfrost during the Saltiron War, a conflict between his country, the Kingdom of Glenbrook and the Holy State of Hyzante. He grew furious at Hyzante's monopoly over salt and contacted King Regna Glenbrook regarding passage into Hyzante, asking for an alliance with him. They allowed the Aesfrosti army to pass through Regna's kingdom, with the catch being Aesfrost must maintain joint control over the source with Glenbrook once they could conquer Hyzante. However, Symon Wolffort and his clan drove back the Aesfrosti's forces and proved themselves to be a fearsome band of warriors. In the midst of the war, Zigmunt took Orlaea, the legendary liberator of the people of Roselle, as one of his concubines for whom he had a daughter, Princess Frederica. He then returned Orlaea to Hyzante and signed the peace treaty, agreeing to those terms. Zigmunt died shortly after the end of the Saltiron War.
Archduke Gustadolph Aesfrost (voiced by Scott Whyte)
He becomes a new ruler of the Grand Duchy of Aesfrost after the death of his father Zigmunt as he reforms the country's government into a meritocracy with his iron fist, even when the lack of salt weakens it tremendously. His cousin Dragan has been attacked and killed by the assassins just as Symon's son Serenoa Wolffort inspects the newly discovered Grand Norzelian Mine with him. Dragan's death leads Gustadolph to accuse the Kingdom of Glenbrook of murdering him, bringing General Alvora there to help with his invasion. He executes King Regna and his son Prince Frani, captures his daughter Princess Cordelia and seizes the kingdom's capital to instill himself as its "new king". But Regna's younger son Prince Roland has escaped with House Wolffort as he becomes a sole heir to Glenbrook's throne. Gustadolph then returns to Aesfrost and finds that his uncle Svarog is illegally smuggling the salt and harboring a suspicions against him, regarding his son's death. His younger brother Thalas and sister Erika are both killed, leaving him to mull over his defeat and find a way to recoup his loss.

Agatean Empire
The Agatean Empire is featured in the Discworld series of novels by Terry Pratchett.

One Sun Mirror, the first Agatean Emperor and unifier of the Counterweight Continent.
A number of unnamed emperors are featured or mentioned in the Discworld novels. The first Emperor, introduced in The Colour of Magic, is described as young and idealistic, being frequently overruled by his Grand Vizier Nine Turning Mirrors, such as in regards to the welfare of the tourist Twoflower in The Colour of Magic (wanting him to be protected and killed respectively), or the prospect of installing gates in the Great Wall which surrounded the entire empire. In Mort, the young Emperor's father and grandfather are mentioned as having also reigned as Emperor. Prior to the events of Interesting Times, he was assassinated and succeeded by his uncle, a near-dead sadist.
In Interesting Times, it is revealed that succession to the Agatean throne is determined by war between five noble families, the Hongs, the Sungs, the Tangs, the McSweeneys and the Fangs, with the hereditary succession depicted in prior novels being said to be rare. The Grand Vizier, Lord Hong, attempted to install himself as Emperor by orchestrating a revolution by the ineffective Red Army (mostly consisting of children held back by Agatean respect for authority) and leading the subsequent counter-revolution; he then becomes leader of the armies of the five noble families in a brief war against the Silver Horde. 
Cohen the Barbarian conquers the Agatean Empire in Interesting Times with the Silver Horde as part of his retirement plan, adopting the regnal name Ghengis Cohen, appointing Twoflower as Grand Vizier, and implementing wide-reaching reform. However, he and his allies abandon it in The Last Hero in order to exact revenge on the Discworld gods at Dunmanifestin for allowing heroes to grow old and die. In The Discworld Atlas, Cohen is referred to as the 'Last Emperor', the Empire being replaced by a 'People's Beneficial Republic' led by a Madame Bufferfly as Chairman of the Central Committee of the People's Revolution (possibly Pretty Butterfly, former leader of the Red Army and Twoflower's daughter).

Agrabah
The Sultan of the fictional Middle Eastern country of Agrabah, the father of Princess Jasmine and father-in-law of the title character in Disney's Aladdin franchise.

Alabasta Kingdom
The Alabasta Kingdom is a desert climate nation in the Japanese anime series, One Piece. It is ruled by the Nefertari family.

Nefertari Cobra (also known as Nefeltari Nebra in English dub)
He was the 12th king of the Alabasta Kingdom whose wife Queen Titi had died twenty-four years prior and daughter Princess Vivi (aka Ms. Wednesday) has been aided by the Straw Hat Pirates, captained by Monkey D. Luffy, in her fight against Baroque Works. Cobra also had his kingdom's army called the Alabasta Royal Guard, commanded first by Igaram and then by Chaka. During the Wano Country Arc, King Cobra was allegedly assassinated by Sabo, chief of staff of the Revolutionary Army, just when Vivi was reported to have disappeared.

Alderaan
Queen Breha Organa (portrayed by Rebecca Jackson Mendoza), the ruler of Alderaan, wife of Senator Bail Organa and secretly adoptive mother of Princess Leia in the film, Star Wars: Episode III – Revenge of the Sith.

Aldovia
Aldovia is a main setting in the Netflix holiday film, A Christmas Prince, and its sequels The Royal Wedding and The Royal Baby. It is ruled by the Charlton family.

Queen Helena Charlton (portrayed by Alice Krige) is the widowed dowager of Aldovia, and the mother of Richard II and Princess Emily Charlton, who was formerly the queen consort of her husband King Richard I before his death.
King Richard Charlton II (portrayed by Ben Lamb), the former crown prince, becomes the new monarch of Aldovia, with Amber Moore as his queen, after the death of his father. In The Royal Baby, Richard and Amber become the parents of the newborn Princess Elleri Claire.

Alexandria
Alexandria is featured in the video game, Final Fantasy IX.

Queen Brahne Raza Alexandros XVI 
The obese ruler of Alexandria who was once kind and well-liked until a strange man called Kuja had convinced her to create an army of Black Mages to wage war on each of other kingdoms and told her of the summoning powers that her adoptive daughter Princess Garnet possessed, which acted only to fuel her greed. Kuja claims that Brahne wanted to wage a war of conquest, and that he merely "gave her a little push", suggesting that Kuja exploited her grief over the death of the previous King of Alexandria to manipulate her into carrying out his goals. Because of this revelation, the Queen ordered her twin court jesters Zorn and Thorn to extract the eidolons from Garnet and then execute her for treason against her kingdom. In the end, Queen Brahne realized how foolish she was under Kuja's control, asked for forgiveness from Garnet and then died in her arms as she stirred anger within the party against Kuja.
Garnet Til Alexandros XVII (aka Dagger)
She becomes the crowned Queen of Alexandria following the death of her adopted mother. During her coronation, however, Kuja attacks with the Dragon King Bahamut, forcing Garnet to draw out Alexander, the legendary eidolon who is summoned with the help of White Mage Eiko Carol. Succumbing to the recent traumatic stress, Queen Garnet often has difficulty concentrating during the battle, resulting in the occasional failure to perform actions such as White Magic and Summoning, as well as being unable to pose at the end of battles. She is then at her mother's grave, contemplating her path in life. And after an impassioned speech to Zidane Tribal, Garnet uses a dagger to cut off most of her hair, symbolizing the severing of ties to her former weak self.

Kingdom of Altea
The Kingdom of Altea is part of the fictional continent of Archanea in the Fire Emblem video game series.

King Anri was the founder of the Kingdom of Altea who was formerly a peasant and rescued Princess Artemis by using the divine blade Falchion sword to slay the villainous Dragon King Medeus of the Dolhr Empire at the climax of the War of Liberation.
King Marcelus became the second monarch of Altea after his brother Anri died unmarried and childless. Marcelus's ascension sparked a dispute among the nobility resulting in the foundation of the Gra Kingdom, which would still remain a close ally of Altea for decades. He was then succeeded by his son and heir, King Marius.
King Cornelius was Marius's only son who became the new ruler of Altea with his wife Liza as its Queen. He set out to fight the revived Medeus at the dawn of the War of Shadows and was then killed in battle at the Fort Menedy border following the betrayal of King Jiol of Gra. He was the father of Princess Elice and Prince Marth.
Marth, the former prince and the legendary hero, becomes the new King of the Kingdom of Altea, known as the "Hero-King", as well as the King of the Archanean Alliance after his father's death, with Princess Caeda of Talys as his Queen, in the video game Fire Emblem Awakening.

Alvarez Empire
The Alvarez Empire is featured in the Japanese anime series, Fairy Tail.

Zeref Dragneel acted as the reigning emperor of the Alvarez Empire under the alias of Emperor Spriggan. He has constructed his military nation over a century prior to counter the threat of Dragon Slayer Acnologia (aka Dragon King) and had his personal guard, an elite unit called the Spriggan 12. Zeref was revealed to be the centuries-old elder brother of Natsu Dragneel and attempted to obtain the limitless power of Fairy Heart, owned by Mavis Vermillion, with which to perform a spell called "Neo Eclipse" that would enable him to undo the actions caused by Acnologia and himself.
Ajeel Raml, the sand wizard and former member of the Spriggan 12, rises to be the king of the Alvarez Empire after Zeref was killed and the disbandment of the Spriggan 12 in attempt rebuild the empire. As a new ruler, he is also guided by his grandfather the minister, Yajeel, and former Spriggan 12 member Jacob Lessio as well as being taught by the Mage Max Alors how to use a spell called the "Raml Sayf" when the Fairy Tail Mage travels to the western continent of Alakitasia to visit him.

Alvonia
King Charles V (portrayed by Mickey Rooney) is the ruler of the small kingdom of Alvonia, even though he is still a child, in the film My Pal, the King.

Principality of Amidonia
The Principality of Amidonia was a rival nation to the Kingdom of Elfrieden in the Japanese light novel series, How a Realist Hero Rebuilt the Kingdom.

Gaius Amidonia VIII
The last ruling prince of the Principality of Amidonia who was one of the major players during the One Week War as he laid siege to Elfrieden's city, Altomura, having trespassed the southwestern border of the kingdom. He was then forced by Elfrieden to flee back into his principality proper. In the subsequent battle, Gaius was killed by Kazuya Souma, Elfrieden's new king, who he was about to kill. His death resulted in the Elfrieden occupation of Amidonia's capital, Van. He was the father of Prince Julius and Princess Roroa Amidonia.
Julius Amidonia
The exiled crown prince who unofficially becomes the new ruler of the Principality of Amidonia after his father designated him upon his death. However, Julius has been driven out of his principality, fleeing to the Gran Chaos Empire. And his entire country, with the intervention of his sister Roroa, becomes annexed into Elfrieden (together known as the Kingdom of Friedonia) with the added bonus of Roroa's hand in marriage to King Kazuya. Julius then becomes a commander of the Union of Eastern Nations and is married to Princess Tia of Lastania.

Amphibia
Amphibia is the titular realm in the Disney Channel animated series of the same name. It is inhabited by the anthropomorphic amphibians.

King Aldrich Leviathan (voiced by William Houston)
He was the previous newt king of Amphibia who resided in its capital, Newtopia, and was the ruthless tyrant determined to continue invading Earth. His son Andrias formed a forbidden friendship with the frog, Leif Plantar, and the toad, Barrel the Brave, for whom Aldrich was not fond of it, claiming that "friendship didn't last" and explaining the importance of the Calamity Box, a magical relic which was later stolen by Leif. After Aldrich's death, his consciousness is held within the monstrous entity, the Core.
King Andrias Leviathan (voiced by Keith David)
He is the current newt king of Amphibia who plots something involving the three human girls, Anne Boonchuy, Sasha Waybright and Marcy Wu, although he seems to be jovial and kind and likes the popular human culture. However, in the Season 2 episode "True Colors", it is revealed that Andrias is a power-hungry and conquering warlord who wants to box back the Calamity Box for conquering other worlds as well as for knowledge.

Andalasia
Andalasia is a fairy tale kingdom in the Disney animated/live-action film, Enchanted, and its sequel, Disenchanted.

Queen Narissa (played by Susan Sarandon) was the evil sorceress who ruled Andalasia and had her great fear that she would lose the throne if her stepson Prince Edward finds himself his own bride, Giselle. She is inspired by the characters of the Wicked Queen (Snow White), Maleficent (Sleeping Beauty) and Lady Tremaine (Cinderella).
Prince Edward (played by James Marsden) becomes the new ruler of Andalasia at the end of the first film after his stepmother's death and defeat, with his new bride Nancy Tremaine becoming a princess. He and Nancy are then the newly crowned king and queen of Andalasia in the sequel. Edward and his ex-fiancée Giselle are the obvious spoofs of the Disney Princes and Disney Princesses respectively.

Androssian Empire
The Androssian Empire is featured in the Star Fox video game series.

Emperor Andross (also known as Andorf in Japanese), the supreme ruler of the Androssian Empire who was once a scientist working for Corneria until he was banished by General Pepper for treason. He builds his imperial army and plots to dominate the Lylat System and rebuild it in his name before capturing the founder of the Star Fox team, James McCloud, and then initiating the Lylat Wars. Andross is the archenemy of James's son, Fox McCloud.
Andrew Oikonny becomes a new ruler of the Androssian Empire after the defeat of his uncle Andross in Star Fox: Assault. He was originally a pilot for the Star Wolf team led by Wolf O'Donnell before being kicked out by them and planning to avenge his uncle's death. As a new emperor, Andrew forms a rebellion against the Corneria Army and pilots his fighter spacecraft resembling Andross. However, his spacecraft was destroyed by the Aparoid.

Ankh-Morpork
Ankh-Morpork is featured in the Discworld series of novels by Terry Pratchett.

Queen Alguinna IV
King Artorollo
 Mentioned in Mort as the reigning monarch of Ankh-Morpork when the Archchancellor and founder of the Unseen University Alberto Malich attempted to perform the Rite of AshkEnte backwards.
 Carelinus
 Mentioned in The Last Hero in a discussion between Cohen the Barbarian and a bard kidnapped by him and the Silver Horde to write a ballad about their quest to 'return fire with interest' to the Discworld Gods at Dunmanifestin.
 He is known for conquering the Discworld except for the Counterweight Continent and XXXX, untying the Tsortian Knot using a sword, and weeping on the shore of Muntab 'for there were no more worlds to conquer'. Following his death, his empire fell apart after his sons started fighting over it.
 His tale inspires Cohen, who cheats Fate in a challenge to roll a seven with a six-sided die (by slicing it in two), and steals the horses of Valkyries (partly to conquer other worlds).
 The Discworld's analogue of Alexander the Great.
King Cirone IV
Queen Coanna
King Loyana the Aaargh
 The shortest reigning monarch in Morporkian history, ruling for 1.13 seconds from coronation to assassination.
King Ludwig the Tree
 Issued numerous bizarre proclamations including the need to develop a new type of frog.
 Responsible for the motto of Ankh-Morpork, Quanti Canicula Ille In Fenestra ('How much is that doggie in the window').
King Paragore
King Tyrril
King Veltrick I
Founded the 'Ankh-Morpork City Watch and Ward' in AM 1561 with his personal motto 'Fabricati Diem, Puncti Agunt Celeriter' ('Make the Day, the Moments Pass Quickly') becoming that of the new police force.
King Veltrick II
Assassinated his father Veltrick II four days after his founding of the 'Ankh-Morpork City Watch and Ward', letting it fall into disarray and obscurity due to a disinterest in maintaining a police force.
King Veltrick III
King Webblethorpe the Unconscious
King Lorenzo the Kind
 Ankh-Morpork's last and worst king, a sadistic torturer who was  'very fond of children'.
 He was overthrown in the Ankh-Morpork Civil War of AM 1688 and subsequently beheaded by Commander of the City Watch Suffer-Not-Injustice 'Old Stoneface' Vimes as no judge would preside over the king's trial. Lorenzo was succeeded by a series of equally or even more tyrannical Patricians, after the people voted against Vimes' attempts to introduce democracy.
Rex Vivat
 During Guards! Guards!, the Unique and Supreme Lodge of the Elucidated Brethren of the Ebon Night overthrow the Patrican, Havelock Vetinari, and install a false pretender (a distant cousin of the lodge master who is not part of the Ankh-Morporkian royal bloodline) as puppet king. This is arranged by the summoning of a dragon (with the use of a book stolen from the Library of the Unseen University) and its subsequent banishment by the pretender. The pretender is readily adopted by the Ankh-Morporkian citizenry as their king despite not knowing his name, 'Rex Vivat' being his assumed name as it was on all of the royal banners. The false king was killed by the dragon shortly after being crowned.
Dragon
 During Guards! Guards!, the dragon banished from the city by the new king returns and installs itself as the new king, keeping Supreme Grand Master Lupine Wonse as its mouthpiece and demanding gold and virgins. Lady Sybil Ramkin deduces that the dragon is in fact female after the swamp dragon Errol successfully courts it, after which they both leave the city.
Captain Carrot Ironfounderson
 A member of the City Watch, he learns his royal heritage in Men at Arms from the Chief of the Assassins Dr Cruces, who had taken over Edward d'Eath's plot to restore the Ankh-Morpork monarchy through use of the gonne, the only firearm ever to be made on the Discworld. 
 He does not acknowledge his claim, preferring instead to be a watchman. He has, on occasion, exercised any royal prerogative he might have when the need arises.
 He has demonstrated various obvious signs that he is a royal scion including a crown-shaped birth mark, his natural leadership skills and his ability to put a sword into stone without cracking it.
 Lord Vetinari keeps Carrot near in order to prevent coups by false pretenders and to exercise powers reserved only for the king through implied consent from Carrot, such as ennobling Watch Commander Sam Vimes as the Duke of Ankh.
Corporal Cecil Wormsborough St. John 'Nobby' Nobbs
 A member of the City Watch, he may or may not be an illegitimate member of the de Nobbes family and the great-grandson of the last Earl of Ankh (making him second-in-line to the Ankh-Morpork throne after Captain Carrot). His potential relationship to the de Nobbes family was revealed in Feet of Clay as part of a plot to restore the monarchy with the Guilds and the ruling families wishing to replace Lord Vetinari with a puppet (Carrot being considered too virtuous) but ultimately with Dragon, King of Arms (the city's chief heraldry expert and vampire) wishing to prevent Captain Carrot producing a future part-werewolf royal line with his girlfriend Sergeant Angua. Commander Vimes reasoned that, given how the Nobbses stole so many things over the years (possibly including the de Nobbes arms ring), Nobby could be proven to be 'the Duke of Pseudopolis, the Serif of Klatch and the Dowager Duchess of Quirm'; however, Nobby later reveals that his family possesses a larger collection of noble jewels which could prove his noble ancestry.

Ant Island
Ant Island is the colony of ants in the Disney-Pixar animated film, A Bug's Life.

The Ant Queen (voiced by Phyllis Diller) is the former ruler of Ant Island and the leader of the ant colony. She is the mother of Princesses Atta and Dot.
Princess Atta (voiced by Julia Louis-Dreyfus) becomes the new Queen of Ant Island after her mother's abdication at the end of the film.

Apollonia
Apollonia is the Italian kingdom in the animated film, Barbie as the Island Princess.

King Peter (voiced by Russell Roberts) is the father of Prince Antonio, who is resistant to let Ro (Princess Rosella) marry Antonio, because Antonio was supposed to marry Princess Luciana.
Queen Danielle (voiced by Patricia Drake) is the mother of Antonio, who is very positive and easygoing, unlike her husband Peter.

Araluen
Araluen is a main setting in the Ranger's Apprentice novel series by John Flanagan.

King Herbert
The very first ruler who established the island nation of Araluen after driving the wild tribesmen of the Scotti out of his country and back into their homeland Picta. He also established the Ranger Corps organization as the intelligence force of the country and assigned a Ranger to each fief.
King Oswald 
An old, previous ruler of Araluen whose mind became so weak that he made the mistake of creating a group of ambitious barons into his council who would then take control of his country by manipulating him and taking advantage of his state of mind. After Oswald died, the evil Baron Morgarath of Gorlan Fief attempted to take over Araluen, employing the help of the fearsome, mythical creatures called the Kalkara. However, Oswald's son and heir, Duncan, defeated Morgarath and driven him into the Mountains of Rain and Night. King Oswald was only mentioned briefly in The Lost Stories.
King Duncan
He has been the new ruler of Araluen after his father's death and Baron Morgarath's defeat until in The Emperor of Nihon-Ja when he is no longer fit to reign, leading his daughter Princess Cassandra and future son-in-law Horace Altman to eventually become queen and prince regent. Duncan is also the knight of his own country as well as a widower after his wife Queen Rosalind Serenne died shortly after giving birth to Cassandra.
Queen Cassandra/Evanlyn Wheeler
Formerly a crown princess, she becomes the queen regnant of Araluen after the abdication of her father. She has been the only heiress to her throne whose laws of succession was changed by her late grandfather King Oswald sometime before she was born to allow a female heir to succeed the throne. Cassandra is married to a knight and prince consort, Horace Altman, with whom she has a daughter Princess Madelyn, as seen in The Royal Ranger: A New Beginning.

Kingdom of Archenland
The Kingdom of Archenland is featured in The Chronicles of Narnia novel series by C. S. Lewis.

King Col was the first ruler of the Kingdom of Archenland, son of King Frank V of Narnia.
King Lune was the widower and the second ruler of the Kingdom of Archenland.
Cor (aka Shasta), son of King Lune, becomes the new king of the Kingdom of Archenland with Aravis, member of the Tarkaan nobility in Calormen, as his queen.
Ram the Great, son of King Cor and Queen Aravis, is the "most famous" king of the Kingdom of Archenland.
King Nain becomes a ruler of the Kingdom of Archenland during the reigning of Miraz.

Arendelle
Arendelle is a fictional Norwegian kingdom featured in Disney's Frozen franchise, which is heavily inspired by Hans Christian Andersen's fairy tale "The Snow Queen".

King Runeard was the previous sovereign of Arendelle in the animated film sequel Frozen II.
King Agnarr, Runeard's son, was the former sovereign of Arendelle and the late father of Elsa and Anna, who reigned alongside his wife Queen Iduna in the first film Frozen.
Elsa the Snow Queen becomes a monarch of Arendelle after her parents' deaths but ends up setting off an eternal winter that consumes her entire kingdom.
Anna, the former princess, becomes the new Queen of Arendelle after the abdication of her older sister Elsa in Frozen II. She has to save her kingdom from evil with the help of Elsa, her lover Kristoff Bjorgman, and Olaf the Snowman.

Valley of the Living Rock
The Valley of the Living Rock is southeast of Arendelle and located within the Black Mountains. It is inhabited by the trolls who can transform into rocks at will.

Grand Pabbie is a troll king of the Valley of the Living Rock who is wise and elderly among many other trolls. His knowledge of magic helps Anna on more than one occasion.

Arulco
Queen Deidranna Reitman, the evil ruler of an island nation of Arulco in the video game Jagged Alliance 2.

Arus/Altea
King Alfor was the ruler of Arus (Altea in Japanese), mentioned in the Voltron franchise.
Princess Allura (also known as Princess Fala in Japanese) becomes a new ruler of Arus after the death of her father Alfor, as well as the new pilot of the Blue Lion after Sven's retirement.

Astrea
Queen Theodosia reclaimed and reconquered her kingdom of Astrea from the Kalovaxians in the Ash Princess novel series by Laura Sebastian.

Atlantica
King Triton (voiced by Kenneth Mars), the sovereign of the underwater kingdom of Atlantica and the father of Ariel and other six Princesses in Disney's The Little Mermaid franchise.

Atlantis
Multiple fictional works have portrayed the legendary civilization of Atlantis as a monarchy (see Atlantis in popular culture).

Atlantida (L'Atlantide)
Queen Antinea, the ruler of Atlantis in the novel Atlantida (also known as L'Atlantide) by Pierre Benoit and its several film adaptations.

Atlantis, the Lost Continent
King Cronus (Kronos) (portrayed by Edgar Stehli) is the ruler of Atlantis who has been manipulated by the ambitious sorcerer Zaren, in the film Atlantis, the Lost Continent. He is the father of Princess Antillia.

Atlantis: The Lost Empire
Atlantis is the main setting of the Disney animated film, Atlantis: The Lost Empire, and its direct-to-video sequel Milo's Return, which are inspired by the ideas of Edgar Cayce. It is similar to the Aztec Empire and its people can usually speak in their own language.

King Kashekim Nedakh (voiced by Leonard Nimoy) was the elderly ruler of the lost kingdom of Atlantis. His wife the Queen was bonded to the powerful crystal and carried toward the Heart of Atlantis just before their kingdom vanished beneath the sea, leaving Kashekim a widower.
Princess Kidagakash Nedakh (voiced by Cree Summer), Kashekim's daughter, becomes a new queen of Atlantis with Milo Thatch as her king. Like her late mother, Kida has been bonded with the crystal as well, only to protect her from immediate bloodshed.

DC Comics
Ocean Master (Orm Marius) was the king of Atlantis in some DC Comics storylines and adaptations, including the "Throne of Atlantis" storyline.
Aquaman (Arthur Curry) becomes the new king of Atlantis in the DC Universe.

The Fairly OddParents
Atlantis has occasionally appeared in the animated television series The Fairly OddParents, in which it is inhabited by merpeople.

Greg (voiced by S. Scott Bullock), a king-like leader of Atlantis in the episode "Something's Fishy!".
King Neptuna (voiced by Jeff Bennett), the ruler of Atlantis in the episode "Dadlantis".

Marvel Comics
Emperor Thakorr was the ruler of Atlantis in the Marvel Comics universe.
Namor becomes the monarch (his title varies) of Atlantis after Thakorr's reign.

Nadia: The Secret of Blue Water
Atlantis (also known as Neo-Atlantis) is a major setting in the Japanese anime series, Nadia: The Secret of Blue Water, which is inspired by the works of Jules Verne. It closely resembles the culture of Ancient Egypt.

Eleusis La Arwall was the former king of Atlantis, and the long-lost father of Princess Nadia, who acted as the captain of the Nautilus submarine under the alias of Nemo. He is based on the character of the same name from Twenty Thousand Leagues Under the Seas and bears a striking resemblance to Captain Bruno J. Global from Super Dimension Fortress Macross.
Benusis La Arwall was placed as the emperor of Neo-Atlantis under the name Emperor Neo through a coup d'état perpetrated by the evil Gargoyle, the leader of the Neo-Atlanteans who was able to control him like a puppet, to dethrone his father Captain Nemo. He eventually regained his free will and managed to sacrifice himself to save his sister Nadia.

The New Adventures of Huckleberry Finn
Atlantis is an underwater kingdom in The New Adventures of Huckleberry Finn episode "All Whirlpools Lead to Atlantis".

King Llandor, the ruler of Atlantis who trades places with Huck Finn, leading the evil Morpho's minions to mistaken Huck for Llandor as they capture him. Eventually, after Huck makes his escape with Tom Sawyer and Becky Thatcher, they help Llandor defeat Morpho and his minions.

Avalor
Avalor is the fictional Latin-American kingdom featured in the Disney Junior animated series, Elena of Avalor.

King Raul and Queen Lucia (voiced by Néstor Carbonell and Andrea Navedo) were the rulers of Avalor and the parents of Princesses Elena and Isabel. They were both killed by Shuriki, the evil sorceress who plots to take over their kingdom.
Elena Castillo Flores (voiced by Aimee Carrero), the former crown princess, becomes the queen of Avalor after her parents' deaths. Her primary goal is to protect her kingdom from the clutches of Shuriki.

Azania
Emperor Seth, the Oxford-graduated ruler of the imperial African nation of Azania who is assisted by his college friend Basil Seal to modernize his empire following a civil war in the novel Black Mischief by Evelyn Waugh.

B

Baam Empire
The Baam Empire is featured in the Japanese anime series, Tōshō Daimos.

Emperor Leon, the Baam-seijin Leader
He was a compassionate monarch of the Baam Empire, and the father of Prince Richter and Princess Erika, whose personal adviser Olban usurped the throne by assassinating him since none of his children had reached the age of maturity as the rightful heir. During the council meeting with the Earth forces, Leon was poisoned by Olban's right-hand man, Georiya, causing the Baams and Earthlings to go under war. To atone for Emperor Leon's death, Erika works as a field doctor while Ritcher serves as the admiral for the Baam forces against Earth until he discovers that Georiya is the one who has killed Leon.

Baharuth Empire
The Baharuth Empire is featured in the Japanese light novel series, Overlord.

Jircniv Rune Farlord El Nix
He is the current emperor of the Baharuth Empire who is known as the "Bloody Emperor" for violently purging many people who gets in his way and replacing them with whomever he sees as more fitting, establishing an absolute monarchy. Upon learning about the evil Sorcerer King Ainz Ooal Gown, Emperor Jircniv intends to turn him into a pawn by sending several workers into the Great Tomb of Nazarick and blaming the Re-Estize Kingdom, until he learns of his true nature. Afterwards, Jircniv ultimately gives up an alliance against Nazarick, submits to Ainz and becomes his vassal.

Balandor
Balandor is a kingdom featured in the White Knight Chronicles video game series.

King Valtos (voiced by Bob Joles)
He was the previous ruler of Balandor whose wife Queen Floraine was assassinated by his royal advisor Demian "Sarvain" Ledom, the evil commander of the Magi organization, causing him to believe it was the Archduchy of Faria that killed her and thus escalate the fight between two nations. However, Valtos eventually saw the war in its true light, so he approached Archduke Dalam of Faria with a peace treaty to be held on his daughter Princess Cisna's 18th birthday. But the Magi proceeded to attack during the ball, and its general Dregias assassinated King Valtos just when he tried to take Cisna to safety.
Queen Cisna (voiced by Kari Wahlgren)
Formerly a princess in the first game, she becomes a new ruler of Balandor after her parents' tragic deaths in the sequel White Knight Chronicles II. She initially remains muted for years since she has witnessed the assassination of her mother Floraine until she regains her voice when General Dregias kills her father Valtos. She has also been kidnapped by the Magi due to her ability to unlock the sealed White Knight but is rescued by her childhood friend Leonard and his allies. As a ruling queen, Cisna sends Leonard and his team to Faria to save its princess Miu during the civil war and later starts a battle against the Magi (now the reborn Yshrenian Empire).

Balt-Rhein Empire
The Balt-Rhein Empire is the antagonist of the Japanese anime series, Altair: A Record of Battles. It is loosely based on the Holy Roman Empire, and its capital St. Michael bears a strong resemblance to Mont-Saint-Michel.

Emperor Goldbalt XI
The dignified and stoic ruler of the Balt-Rhein Empire who is close to his villainous prime minister, Virgilio Louis, and passively allows him to take charge of the empire's expansionist campaign, although he is fully aware of his schemes. Goldbalt seemingly shares Louis's belief that his empire, in order to survive, must keep conquering other nations. Goldbalt also has two sons, Günther and Gustav.

Baronia
The King of Baronia, father of Prince Paul, in The Secret Series of novels by Enid Blyton.

Belgardia
King Maxmilian (portrayed by Ferdinand Gottschalk) is the dotty ruler of the impoverished European kingdom of Belgardia and the father of Princess Tania (aka Catherine Bell) in the film King Kelly of the U.S.A..

Belgravia
Belgravia is a kingdom ruled by the Wyndham family in The Princess Switch film trilogy on Netflix. It is named after the district in Central London.

King George and Queen Caroline Wyndham (portrayed by Pavel Douglas and Sara Stewart)
The rulers of Belgravia who in the first film to the series betroth their son Crown Prince Edward to Lady Margaret Delacourt, Duchess of Montenaro. Before their royal wedding, however, Margaret switches places with her look-alike Stacy De Novo, a young baker from Chicago who visits Belgravia for the baking competition with her friend and assistant Kevin Richards. During the switch, King George suspects something is off with the "duchess", instructing his butler Frank De Luca to watch over her. Frank takes a photo of Margaret and Stacy switching back and is about to show it to George to expose the ruse, but Caroline intercepts. Instead of attending the baking contest in person, Queen Caroline fakes illness to send both Edward and Margaret to this competition in her place. After the contest, Margaret and Stacy admit their switching and Prince Edward later marries Stacy, making her the princess of Belgravia.

Kingdom of Bern
The Kingdom of Bern is part of the fictional continent of Elibe in the video game, Fire Emblem: The Binding Blade, and its prequel The Blazing Blade.

King Hartmut was the founder of the Kingdom of Bern who was the original wielder of both Eckesachs sword and the Binding Blade sword and led a group of eight powerful warriors called the Eight Legends in an attack on the Dragon Sanctuary in order to defeat the evil demon dragon, Idunn, during the Scouring war, framed by future generations as the greatest hero of the whole Scouring.
King Desmond was a crucial ruler of the Kingdom of Bern in The Blazing Blade. He was married to Queen Hellene, the noblewoman from Etruia, with whom he had a son and heir Prince Zephiel. But his marriage to Hellene had come to an end with a separation as he engaged in a relationship with his mistress, which yielded their daughter Princess Guinivere. Desmond hated his son Zephiel being around Guinivere, so he sent him away from her.
King Zephiel, formerly a crown prince, became a new ruler of the Kingdom of Bern after faking his own death to slay his father Desmond with his sword during the funeral. In The Binding Blade, Zephiel gradually attempts to take over Elibe with the help of Idunn, wishing to crush all of humanity and give the entire world to the dragons. However, his kingdom was stopped by the combined forces of the Lycian League and Etruia led by General Roy, the young nobleman of House Pherae.
Princess Guinivere becomes a queen regnant and current ruler of the Kingdom of Bern after defeating her older half-brother Zephiel and ending a war, aided by General Roy and his army, in spite of the protests of some aristocrats.

Bialya
The Queen Bee was an evil crime lord who established an inroad into the dictatorship of the terrorist nation of Bialya in the DC Universe.
Queen Beatriz, the Queen Bee's sister, became the new ruler of Bialya but was later toppled presumably from power.

Boiling Isles
The Boiling Isles is a main setting of the Disney Channel animated series, The Owl House. It is inhabited by the witches and magical creatures.

Philip Wittebane/Emperor Belos
He is the mysterious and sinister masked man who rules the Boiling Isles in the Demon Realm, creates the Coven system to restrict the knowledge and use of magic, and spends his time planning and preparing for what he calls the "Day of Unity" to enter Luz Noceda's home in the Human Realm on Earth. In Season 2, it is revealed he is actually a human witch hunter from the Human Realm bent on destroying all of witchcraft.

Bongo Congo
King Leonardo (voiced by Jackson Beck) is an anthropomorphic lion who is the well-being but often inept ruler of the fictional African kingdom of Bongo Congo in the animated television series, King Leonardo and His Short Subjects.

Borogravia
Borogravia is featured in the Discworld series of novels by Terry Pratchett.

Duchess Annagovia is the ruler of Borogravia at the time of events of Monstrous Regiment. The Duchess achieved virtual godhood amongst her subjects due to the growing number of impractical and inconvenient 'Abominations' issued by Nuggan, the resident god of Borogravia. The war between Borogravia and neighbouring Zlobenia was, in part, motivated by the Prince Heinrich's attempt to assert his claim to the Duchy, believing that the Duchess had been dead for some time.

Borovia
King Otto (voiced by Timothy West) is the monarch of the land of Borovia and the single father of Princesses Lucy and Loretta, in the British animated series The Big Knights.

Borsovia
King Boris is the sovereign of the Kingdom of Borsovia in the British children's series, A Rubovian Legend.

Bremagne
Bremagne is one of the Eleven Kingdoms in the series of Deryni novels by Katherine Kurtz.

House of Erispoé
King Erispoé Méen, reigned from 555 to 577.
King Hoël le Magne, reigned from 577 to 598.
King Meyric I, reigned from 598 to 609.
King Gurmhaillon, reigned from 609 to 635.
King Judicaël, reigned from 635 to 645.
King Chilperich, reigned from 645 to 651.
King Pléon, reigned from 652 to 673.
King Mériadec, reigned from 673 to 680.
King Ursion I, reigned from 680 to 701.
King Gisloald, reigned from 701 to 722.
King Adalbéron, reigned from 722 to 762.
King Ursion II, reigned from 762 to 777.
King Ryol I, reigned from 777 to 793.

House of Faucon
King Faucon I, reigned from 793 to 820.
King Déodat, reigned from 820 to 822.
King Faucon II, reigned from 822 to 841.
King Gérard, reigned from 841 to 855.
King Quintin, reigned only in one year.
King Enguerrand, reigned from 855 to 886.
King Théofrid, reigned from 886 to 893.
King Adalbéron II, reigned from 893 to 894.
King Manassés, reigned from 894 to 919.
King Leothéric, reigned from 919 to 942.
King Valentin, reigned from 942 to 944.
King Joscerand I, reigned from 944 to 947.
King Théofrid II, reigned from 947 to 977.
King Raculphe I, reigned from 977 to 989.
King Harduin, reigned from 989 to 1006.
King Théofrid III, reigned from 1006 to 1031.
King Otton, reigned from 1031 to 1033.
King Joscerand II, reigned from 1033 to 1050.
King Théofrid IV, reigned from 1050 to 1055.
King Raculphe II, reigned 1055 to 1076.
King Charibert, reigned from 1076 to 1107.
King Meyric II, reigned from 1107 to 1118.
King Ryol II, currently reigns since 1118.

Bretzelburg
King Ladislas of Bretzelburg, in the Spirou et Fantasio comic series.

Burger King Kingdom
The Burger King is the reigning monarch of the Burger King Kingdom and the primary mascot of the fast-food restaurant chain of the same name. He performed magic tricks that were mostly sleight-of-hand, as the "Marvelous Magical Burger King", in the mid 1970s until the late 1980s.

Buronia
Buronia is an island kingdom in the Netflix television series, Prince of Peoria.

King Maxemil Vanderklaut II (portrayed by Johnathan McClain)
He is the ruler of Buronia who in one episode "The King Arrives" travels to Peoria, Illinois to bring his son Prince Maxemil Vanderklaut III (or Emil for short) back to their kingdom. But Emil's friends Teddy Jackson and Sydney Quinn have to find a loophole in the kingdom's law that would allow Emil to stay in Peoria. However, in the last episode "The Summer of Teddy & Emil", the King gets injured by falling off the balcony over a banana peel in his castle, leading Prince Emil to be called back home and take charge.

Byzantos
Byzantos is an empire featured in the Brotherband novel, The Caldera, by John Flanagan. Its name is possibly based on the Byzantine Empire.

Emperor Constantus the First
He was the founder and first emperor who built Byzantos in the eastern lands when the Toscan Empire became too large and unwieldly to control and subsequently split into separated east and west nations. He also built his empire's capital on a strategical point that was defended three-ways by water and secure behind high walls he rose.
Empress Justina
She is a widowed empress regent of Byzantos who has practically taken over the reign after the death of her husband the previous emperor, gaining the allegiance of the imperial guards, captained by Olaf Attelson, and a vast collection of the nobles. She deems her son Constantus too young to rule and is known for her unpredictable temper.
Emperor Constantus II
He is the heir to the throne who is technically placed as a new ruler of Byzantos after his father's death, in spite of his young age. His bodyguard is Olaf Attelson, captain of the imperial guards, and he has been kidnapped and held for ransom by Mygros, the corsair captain of the Vulture pirates, for a period of three months in his island hideout. However, Olaf and the Heron brotherband rescue Constantus and return him to his empire.

C

Cadonia
Cadonia is featured in the two-act musical, King of Cadonia.

The Duke of Alasia is an heir presumptive who is too timid to inherit the throne and dreads above all things being called upon to rule an unstable country of Cadonia. He is the reluctant father of Princess Marie. 
King Alexis is the rightful sovereign of Cadonia who leaves his country in his disguise, being tired of the limitations that have been placed on his freedom, and eventually returns to acknowledge that Cadonia is fortunate enough to secure a trusted monarch.

Cagliostro
Cagliostro is the smallest European grand duchy in the Japanese anime film, Lupin III: The Castle of Cagliostro. It is derived from the Arsène Lupin novel, The Countess of Cagliostro.

Count Lazare d'Cagliostro
He was a villainous regent of Cagliostro whose arranged marriage would cement his power and recover the country's fabled ancient treasure, for which he needs the ancestral rings of both his and Princess Clarisse. Count Cagliostro sent out his men to find Clarisse in attempt to marry her with their rings. He was ultimately killed and crushed by the mechanism between the arms of the castle's clock tower after pursuing Clarisse and Arsène Lupin III, a gentleman thief who disrupted the wedding ceremony and foiled his evil plan. He is based on Italian occultist Count Alessandro Cagliostro.
Lady Clarisse d'Cagliostro
She is the last princess and rightful heir of Cagliostro whose parents, the previous monarchs, were killed in a fire which destroyed the grand ducal palace. In spite of the Count's evil plan to marry, Clarisse is repulsed by his greedy and cruel personality and flees his presence during the try-on of her bridal dress. She is a friend to Arsène Lupin III who she has been rescued from her forced marriage to the Count. Later, after the Count was killed and defeated, she becomes a new ruler of Cagliostro. She is named after Clarisse d'Etigues, the wife of the original Arsène Lupin in The Countess of Cagliostro.

Calbia
Calbia is a small Balkan kingdom in the Doc Savage story, The King Maker, by Lester Dent and Harold A. Davis.

Da Le Galbin was the first king of Calbia who has been overthrown when his kingdom is under siege.
Clark "Doc" Savage, the scientist and detective, has been chosen by the Kingmaker to be the new ruler of Calbia during the terrorism.

Caledonia
Caledonia is a European sovereign kingdom country in television series Scandal season five episode "Heavy Is the Head". It is based on the United Kingdom.

Queen Isabel (portrayed by Dearbhla Molloy), former monarch of Caledonia. During the episode "Heavy Is the Head", she makes a state visit to the United States to negotiate with President Fitzgerald Grant the opening of a new naval base and arranges the assassination of her daughter-in-law, Princess Emily, after she became pregnant during an affair with one of her security details. Isabel is based on Queen Elizabeth II of the United Kingdom.
Prince Richard (portrayed by Adam Fergus) becomes monarch of Caledonia. After Olivia Pope reveals to him the role his mother played in the death of his wife Emily (having been originally hired to deal with press reaction to the incident), he forces her to abdicate on grounds of 'ill health'. He refuses to allow the United States to open a naval base in his kingdom. Richard is based on King Charles III of the United Kingdom.

Empire of Calormen
The Empire of Calormen is southeast of Narnia in The Chronicles of Narnia novel series by C. S. Lewis. Its imperial monarch is known as the "Tisroc".

Ardeeb Tisroc, the ancestor of Aravis Tarkaan who was said among the Calormenes to be descended from Tash, the god of Calormen.
Illsombreh Tisroc, Ardeeb's only son who became a ruler of the Empire of Calormen and was the father of Kidrash Tarkaan (Aravis's great-grandfather).
Rabadash, the son and heir of the previous Tisroc, becomes the new ruling Tisroc of the Empire of Calormen but has been turned into a donkey by Aslan who declares that he must return to the temple of Tash.

Candy Kingdom
Princess Bonnibel "Bonnie" Bubblegum, the Gum Golem, is the ruler of the Candy Kingdom who tasks her close friends Finn Mertens and Jake the Dog with quests in service of her kingdom, in the animated television series Adventure Time.

Caronia
Caronia is a fictional Balkan kingdom in television series Get Smart season 3 episode "The King Lives?" It is a parody of Ruritania in The Prisoner of Zenda.

King Charles IX (portrayed by Don Adams)
He is the rightful heir to the throne of Caronia whose half-brother the prime minister, Prince Basil, plots to kill him by colluding with KAOS, the "international organization of evil", so that he can take over the throne. However, Maxwell Smart (aka Agent 86) goes undercover as Charles due to being his look-alike while recovering for his coronation, leading Basil to order the kidnapping of Agent 99 to use her in exchange for Charles's whereabouts. King Charles has also been betrothed to Princess Marta of Esterhagen who has mistaken Maxwell for him. In the two-part episode "To Sire, with Love", Charles travels to Washington to secure a loan from the United States to keep his royal army strong but has been kidnapped and held hostage by Rupert of Rathskeller for the Royal Diamond Scepter below his kingdom's embassy.

Carpathia
Carpathia is a Balkan country in the play, The Sleeping Prince, and its film adaptation, The Prince and the Showgirl.

Prince Charles is the widowed prince regent of Carpathia whose mother-in-law is the Dowager Queen and who is in love with American actress Mary Morgan (or Elsie Marina in the film). He and his mother-in-law are inspired by King Carol II and Queen Marie of Romania.
King Nicholas VIII, Charles's son, has been set to become a monarch of Carpathia even though he is still a teenage boy. He is inspired by King Michael I of Romania.

Clonmel
Clonmel is a kingdom in the fictional island continent of Hibernia in the Ranger's Apprentice novel series by John Flanagan.

Halt O'Carrick, the former crown prince and retired Ranger, was meant to be the heir to the throne of Clonmel but has been sabotaged by his younger twin brother Ferris, as it is revealed in The Kings of Clonmel.
Ferris O'Carrick was the King of Clonmel who attempted to kill Halt at least triple time when they were young. He was said to be jealous of power, but generally weak monarch.
Sean O'Carrick, Halt and Ferris's nephew, takes the throne and becomes a new ruler of Clonmel after Ferris was killed by the infamous Genovesan Assassins and Halt abdicated this throne.

Cloud Kingdom
The Cloud Kingdom is a major setting that floats high in the sky in the animated film, Barbie and the Magic of Pegasus.

Rayla, the Cloud Queen (voiced by Kathleen Barr)
The ruler of the Cloud Kingdom who lets Princess Brietta, who has been turned into a Pegasus by the evil sorcerer Wenlock, live in her kingdom and later tells Brietta's younger sister, Princess Annika, that the only thing that can defeat Wenlock and save Brietta's kingdom is a build-up magic wand called the Wand of Light. Queen Rayla also gives Brietta and Annika a small bell to ring whenever they need their help; she sends two Pegasus to the princesses after Annika uses the Wand of Light to change Brietta back into a human. In the end, Queen Rayla and Princess Brietta lift the Wand of Light into the sky, turning it into a star.

Cordinia
Queen Isadora (portrayed by Jane Seymour) is the sovereign of the small country of Cordinia, the mother of Prince Leopold (aka Leo James) and the mother-in-law of Emily Taylor in the Hallmark Channel holiday television film A Royal Christmas.

Corona
The island kingdom of Corona is a major setting of Disney's Tangled franchise. It is inspired by Mont-Saint-Michel.

Herz Der Sonne, the first king of Corona whose journal holds his kingdom's secrets that were made in his time and acts as a map to the underground tunnel system he built. Corona was in bitter war with their rival kingdom of Saporia and was invaded by Der Sonne's former enemy, General Shampanier, for whom the king later declared their love. He married Shampanier to make her his queen, and their union brought peace between their kingdoms.
Robin XI, the second previous king of Corona and the father of Queen Arianna and Willow.
Queen Arianna and King Frederic, the former monarchs of Corona and the biological parents of Rapunzel. They release several floating lanterns into the sky each year to celebrate Rapunzel's birthday.
Queen Rapunzel, formerly a princess and heir, becomes a current monarch of Corona, with Eugene Fitzherbert (aka Flynn Rider) as her king, when her parents' memories have been erased by Varian and Andrew in the season finale of the animated series, Rapunzel's Tangled Adventure.

Costa Luna
Costa Luna is a small Caribbean kingdom in the Disney Channel television film, Princess Protection Program.

Queen Sofía Fioré (portrayed by Sully Díaz), the widowed dowager whose husband the King of Costa Luna had died long before she has been captured and forced to marry the evil General Kane. She later becomes a queen mother when her daughter Rosalinda becomes a new queen.
General Magnus Kane (portrayed by Johnny Ray Rodríguez), the villainous dictator from the neighboring country of Costa Estrella, has invaded and taken over Costa Luna as well as plotting to marry Queen Sofía.
Rosalinda María Montoya Fioré (aka Rosie Gonzalez) (portrayed by Demi Lovato), a former princess, becomes a rightfully crowned queen of Costa Luna after dethroning General Kane. She has been escorted by the Princess Protection Program, a secret organization agented by Major Joe Mason whose daughter Carter Mason befriends Rosalinda.

Kingdom of Crimea
The Kingdom of Crimea is part of the fictional continent of Telluis in the video game, Fire Emblem: Path of Radiance, and its sequel Radiant Dawn.

King Ramon Crimea was a previous ruler of the Kingdom of Crimea and the brother of the Gold Knight Renning (aka Bertram), one of the Four Riders of the Daein kingdom. He and his wife the Queen were personally killed by the villainous King Ashnard of Daein, who broke into the Crimean castle during the Mad King's War.
Queen Elincia Ridell Crimea, formerly a princess in Path of Radiance, becomes a new ruler of the Kingdom of Crimea following the death of her father Ramon. Her kingdom, however, is still undergoing recession from Daein's former invasion, so she attempts to rebuild the weakened kingdom with her milk siblings Lucia and Geoffrey, Count Bastian of Fayre, and Ranger Ike the Radiant Hero on the side. In Fire Emblem Awakening, Elincia is a royal Falcon Knight.

Crystal Kingdom
The Crystal Kingdom is a story book location in the Dora the Explorer episode "Dora Saves the Crystal Kingdom".

The Greedy King (voiced by Richard Kind), who initially refused to share with others in the Crystal Kingdom, learns to share everything, passing the crown to Allie.
Allie (voiced by Sabrina Jiang) was a normal persevered citizen of the Crystal Kingdom who then aids Dora and Boots to save the kingdom and take the Greedy King's place as queen.

D

Dale
Bard the Bowman becomes king of Dale in the novel The Hobbit by J. R. R. Tolkien.

Dar-Shan
Dar-Shan is a kingdom in a parallel dimension from Earth in the animated television series, Wildfire.

Queen Sarana (voiced by Amanda McBroom)
She was the regnant of Dar-Shan who was about to marry her consort, Prince Cavan. But her wicked stepsister Lady Diabolyn wanted to take over the throne as she placed a curse on the couple, for which they would be together only one year until they die after that time. One year later, shortly after the birth of her daughter Princess Sara, Sarana fell ill and entrusted her baby to a mystical talking horse, Wildfire, to bring her to the Earth with a magical amulet as her only link with her past. Wildfire deposits Sara in Montana where she is raised in a farm by her father Cavan, who is now named John Cavanaugh due to his amnesia. Twelve years later, Sara discovers her true identity as a princess-in-hiding and is destined to fight Diabolyn with Wildfire, sorcerer Alvinar, Dorin and his colt Brutus, preventing her from becoming Dar-Shan's new queen.

Dark Kingdom
The Dark Kingdom is led by the evil, reigning queen regnants in the Sailor Moon franchise.

Queen Beryl 
She was the ruler of the Dark Kingdom who was able to summon Prince Endymion of the Kingdom of Earth, whom she had the affections to, as a lifeless thrall to her side. She recruited her four reincarnated generals called the Four Kings of Heaven to find the Silver Crystal that revived Prince Endymion with a fragment inside him. Unfortunately, Beryl failed in her attempt to get the Silver Crystal and was killed by Sailor Venus with the Holy Moon Sword.
Queen Metaria 
She is the true mastermind and the amorphous energy being of the Dark Kingdom who associates with the corrupted Queen Beryl and is responsible for the fall of the Silver Millennium. She is an incarnation of Chaos, the final arch-villain, and summons a reborn Beryl into her service to obtain the Silver Crystal that she takes its power as her own. But after Princess Serenity and Prince Endymion restore the Silver Crystal and then escape with it, Metaria has been destroyed as the Silver Crystal's power was used to bring the entire populations of Earth back to life.

Daventry
Daventry is a kingdom whose royal family completes each mission to save their country in the King's Quest video game franchise.

King Edward the Benevolent 
He was the original monarch of Daventry who sent his royal knight, Sir Graham, to retrieve three lost treasures that were stolen by the evil, treacherous witch Dahlia (who disguised herself as a beautiful princess of Cumberland) and restore peace to his kingdom. Edward also wanted Graham to ascend his throne as Daventry's new king, since he had no heir to take over, before he would die.
King Graham
Formerly a knight, he becomes the new ruler of Daventry after King Edward's death and rescues Princess Valanice of Kolyma, who has become his queen, with whom he has twins Prince Alexander (aka Gwydion) and Princess Rosella. He has also been sent by an owl named Cedric to the land of Serenia to rescue not only his royal family but also his future daughter-in-law Princess Cassima of the Green Isles from the evil wizard Mordack. In the episodic video game series, Graham tells his granddaughter Princess Gwendolyn all about his previous adventures.

Diamond Castle
The Diamond Castle is located in an unknown kingdom in Europe (presumably near Greece) in the animated film, Barbie & the Diamond Castle.
Dori, Phaedra, and Melody (formerly Lydia), the Muses of Music. 
The Muses of Music are a trio of women who are in charge of music all over the world. Lydia was one of them, but she grew jealous and left Dori and Phaedra behind, later surrounding them and turning them into statues. She later came back for the Diamond Castle and tried to force Melody, the apprentice, to tell reveal the secret hiding spot. Melody eventually defeated Lydia and her dragon Slyder with the help of Liana and Alexa, Princesses of Music, and she takes Lydia's place as the third muse. They are physically based on Greek goddesses.

Ding Dong Dell
Ding Dong Dell is featured in the video game, Ni no Kuni: Wrath of the White Witch, and its sequel Revenant Kingdom. Its ruler is referred to as "His/Her Meowjesty".

King Tom Tildrum XIV (voiced by Lewis MacLeod) was the monarch of the kingdom of Ding Dong Dell who was heartbroken by the evil wizard Shadar and gave a lack of enthusiasm to Oliver whom he was later cured by using that enthusiasm. He was the soulmate of Ms. Leila's pet cat, Timmy Toldrum.
King Leonhard Tildrum (voiced by Richard Ridings) was the previous monarch of Ding Dong Dell whose villainous advisor Otto Mausinger poisoned him to assume control of his kingdom.
King Evan Pettiwhisker Tildrum (voiced by Claire Morgan) is the young and rightful heir of Ding Dong Dell who prepares himself to assume the throne, following his father's untimely death. He is usurped from his castle and sets out with his ally Roland Crane to defeat Otto Mausinger and reclaim his kingdom.

Disney Castle
Disney Castle is featured in the Kingdom Hearts video game series.

Mickey Mouse plays the role of the King of Disney Castle who is an experienced Keyblade Master and travels to different worlds to battle the forces of darkness, alongside his loyal allies Sora, Donald Duck and Goofy.
Minnie Mouse is the Queen of Disney Castle who rules when her husband Mickey is absent.

Djelibeybi
Djelibeybi is featured in the Discworld series of novels by Terry Pratchett.

Khuft, who founded Djelibeybi seven-thousand years before the events of Pyramids. Venerated as a patriarch, he was a camel herder evading retribution for selling poor quality camels.
Pta-ka-ba, mentioned as being king when Djelibeybi ruled half of the Klatch continent from the Circle Sea to the Rim Ocean.
Khat-leon-ra-pta, mentioned as being queen when Howondaland was conquered during the Second Empire.
Kheneth XIV, mentioned in relation to time dilation that occurred during the construction of his tomb.
Pteppicymon XXVII, father of Teppic and Ptracia.
Pteppicymon XXVIII (aka Teppic), the main character in Pyramids. His education at the Assassins' Guild in Ankh-Morpork gave him a cosmopolitan nature which clashed with the hidebound traditions of the Kingdom and his High Priest Dios.
Ptraci I, Teppic's half-sister who implements numerous reforms to the old kingdom after her half-brother's abdication.

Donpa Kingdom
The Donpa Kingdom is mentioned in the video game Team Sonic Racing.

Dodon Pa (voiced by Kyle Hebert), the anthropomorphic alien tanuki, is the King of the Donpa Kingdom and the President of the Donpa Motors automotive corporation who invites Sonic the Hedgehog and his company to compete in the series of team-based races.

Dor
King Philip (voiced by James Nesbitt), the widowed monarch of the fictional French kingdom of Dor and the father of Princess Pea in the book The Tale of Despereaux by Kate DiCamillo and its animated film adaptation.

Drakon Empire
The Drakon Empire is featured in the Fleetway Publications comic series, Sonic the Comic. The Drakons are a race of alien fish.

Emperor Ko-Dorr, the head of the House of War who rules the Drakon Empire alongside Sister Haggra of the House of Magic and Master Scholar of the House of Knowledge and makes a deal with Dr. Robotnik, offering to help defeat Sonic the Hedgehog, if in exchange Robotnik would help him to acquire the seven Chaos Emeralds. Ko-Dorr is very ambitious and hopes to rule all three Houses himself.

Dream Land
King Dedede is a self-proclaimed monarch of Dream Land, although he has no interest in actually reigning, in the Kirby video game franchise. He is the archrival of the title character.

Dreamland
Dreamland is featured in the animated television series, Disenchantment. It is ruled by the House of Grunkwitz.

King Zøg Grunkwitz (voiced by John DiMaggio)
He is a hot-tempered, overweight ruler of Dreamland whose first wife Queen Dagmar poisoned the wine, which was meant for him, but accidentally poisoned herself after their daughter Princess Bean switched their glasses. Zøg has been remarried to Queen Oona, a humanoid reptile from the kingdom of Dankmire, with whom he has stepson Prince Derek. However, he and Oona are divorced, leaving him for his brief date with Ursula, a selkie who is half bear and half woman. He is a reference to King Zog I of Albania.
Queen Tiabeanie Mariabeanie de la Rochambeau Grunkwitz (voiced by Abbi Jacobson)
Formerly a princess, Bean is crowned queen of Dreamland after her father King Zøg is deemed too crazy and unfit to reign their kingdom. She accidentally shoots Zøg, leading royal advisor Odval and his partner in crime the Arch Druidess to rig her trials, have her sentenced to death by burning and briefly make her half-brother Derek to be a de facto king. However, Zøg grows mentally insane after being buried alive and later shares the throne with Queen Bean. She is bisexual, or pansexual, as she has initially been set to marry Prince Merkimer of Bentwood but eventually begins a relationship with Mora the Mermaid.

Dressrosa
Dressrosa is an island kingdom within the New World in the Japanese anime series, One Piece. It is ruled by the Riku family.

Riku Doldo III
He is the king of Dressrosa who the Don Quixote Pirates has taken over his kingdom, with their captain Don Quixote Doflamingo dethroning him to become the usurper king and top officer Diamante killing his older daughter Princess Scarlett. But his younger daughter Princess Viola (aka Violet) has joined them in order to prevent Doflamingo from killing him until betraying the crew. Doldo enters the Corrida Colosseum under the alias of "Ricky" to compete for the Mera Mera no Mi Fruit. After Monkey D. Luffy and his Straw Hat Pirate crew defeat the Don Quixote Pirates, Doldo becomes the recrowned king, and his granddaughter Rebecca abdicates her position as a crown princess to Viola.

Tontatta Kingdom
The Tontatta Kingdom is a little nation hidden in Green Bit, an island next to Dressrosa. It is inhabited by the tiny dwarves, who together known as the Tontatta Tribe.

Tonta-Chief Gancho
The dwarf king of the Tontatta Kingdom who believes that Usopp of the Straw Hat Pirates is the be the descendant of Mont Blanc Noland. He and the other dwarves request Usopp to lead them in the battle against the Don Quixote Pirates, before they march to Dressrosa with him and Nico Robin through an underground passage. Gancho's daughter, Princess Mansherry, has been taken captive by the Don Quixote Pirates due to her power of the Heal-Heal Fruit that gives her the ability to instantly heal the people's injuries with her tears. Both Gancho and Mansherry then introduce themselves to the Dressrosa denizens when King Doldo returns to the throne.

Dulcinea
Dulcinea is featured in the animated film, Barbie as the Princess and the Pauper.

King Dominick (voiced by Mark Hildreth)
He is a young, rich monarch of Dulcinea who plays the instruments. He has been betrothed to Princess Anneliese by her mother Queen Genevieve, but is mistakenly in love with Erika, the pauper girl who impersonates Anneliese. He disguises himself as a page in hopes to find true love without any pretense. And after rescuing Erika from Madame Carp and Genevieve's advisor Preminger, Dominick later makes her his queen consort under his royal marriage.

Lordship of Duloc
The Lordship of Duloc is featured in Dreamworks' Shrek franchise.

Lord Maximus Farquaad (voiced by John Lithgow)
In the first animated film to the series, Farquaad was the ruthless diminutive nobleman who ruled the Lordship of Duloc and attempted to get rid of all the fairy tale creatures, offering a bounty for their capture and then exiling them to Shrek's swamp. He wanted to become a king and make Duloc the kingdom, but the Magic Mirror stated that he had to marry a princess to be one. He decided on Princess Fiona who was beautiful enough to be his own queen. To bring Fiona over to him, however, Farquaad sent Shrek and Donkey to go rescue her from the dragon-guarded tower as their deed in order to move the fairy tale creatures out of Shrek's swamp. He later proposed to Fiona to have her marry him by sunset, but not until she transformed into an ogre like Shrek just after sunset. Lord Farquaad then rejected his bride, trying to banish her back to the tower and sentence Shrek to death, shortly before the Dragon who had guarded the tower devoured him whole. The musical adaptation reveals that Farquaad's parents were one of the Seven Dwarfs and a princess from "The Princess and the Pea", who were the previous rulers of Duloc.

DunBroch
King Fergus (voiced by Billy Connolly) is a warrior monarch of the fictional Scottish kingdom of DunBorch, the father of Princess Merida and Princes Harris, Hubert and Hamish, and the husband of Queen Elinor in the Disney-Pixar animated film Brave.

Dunwyn
King Gregor (voiced by Michael Rye), benevolent ruler of Dunwyn and the father of Princess Calla in the Disney animated television series Adventures of the Gummi Bears.

Duren
Duren is part of the fictional continent of Xadia in the Netflix animated series, The Dragon Prince.

Queens Annika and Neha were the lesbian married couple and the previous rulers of Duren who were killed during the fight with Dragon King Avizandum (aka Thunder).
Queen Aanya, Annika and Neha's daughter, becomes a new ruler of Duren after her mothers' tragic deaths. She is wise beyond her years, although she is still a child.

E

Earlshide Kingdom
The Earlshide Kingdom is a major setting in the Japanese anime series, Wise Man's Grandchild.

Diseum von Earlshide
He is the king of the Earlshide Kingdom, and the father of Crown Prince August and Princess May, who recommends salaryman Shin Wolford to attend his Magic Academy when his adopted grandfather "Sage" Merlin Wolford forgets to teach him common sense. Diseum has been a friend with Merlin and his ex-wife Melida Bowen after hailing them as heroes since they had seized the calamity that brought near extinction to his kingdom in his days at the Magic Academy.

Earth Kingdom
The Earth Kingdom is featured in the Avatar: The Last Airbender franchise. The ruler of the Earth Kingdom is known as the "Earth King" or "Earth Queen".

Earth King Kuei, the 52nd monarch of the Earth Kingdom. He first appears in the second season of the original animated television series, Avatar: The Last Airbender.
Earth Queen Hou-Ting, the 53rd monarch of the Earth Kingdom, the daughter of Kuei and the great-aunt of Prince Wu. She first appears in the third season of the sequel series, The Legend of Korra.

Eastern Commonwealth
The Eastern Commonwealth is featured in the novel series The Lunar Chronicles by Marissa Meyer.

 Emperor Rikan, the previous ruler of the Eastern Commonwealth who died of the plague.
 Emperor Kaito "Kai", formerly crown prince, becomes a new ruler of the Eastern Commonwealth following his father's death.

Edenia
Edenia is one of the realms featured in the Mortal Kombat video game franchise. It closely resembles the Garden of Eden, hence its name.

King Jerrod
He was the original ruler of Edenia, and the biological father of Princess Kitana, whose kingdom was invaded by Emperor Shao Kahn of Outworld, resulting in a forceful merging of the two realms. His finest warriors, however, lost in the Mortal Kombat tournaments and he himself was defeated and killed by Kahn's evil forces. In Mortal Kombat (2011), Jerrod's soul takes control of the body of warrior Ermac, quelling several other souls fighting to assert themselves after Kahn is defeated, before he returns to his realm to reclaim his kingship.
Queen Sindel
She becomes the queen dowager after her husband Jerrod was killed during Outworld's invasion in Edenia. As Shao Kahn adopts her daughter Kitana, Sindel commits suicide rather than become his consort. However, she is resurrected by Kahn with the assistance of sorcerer Shang Tsung in Earthrealm. Soon after her revival, she has been brainwashed with no knowledge of her true past until Kitana convinces her of it, turning her against Kahn.

Kingdom of Elbe
The Kingdom of Elbe was a country and former vassal state of the antagonistic Empire within the Special Region in the Japanese anime series, Gate: Thus the Japanese Self-Defense Force Fought in Their Land. It is named after the major river in Germany and the Czech Republic.

King Duran
He is the ruler of the Kingdom of Elbe who has been the second wave of forces sent by the Empire to recapture Alnus hill from the "invaders" of the Japanese Self-Defense Forces. However, Duran eventually poses secretly as a disabled refugee at Alnus after his forces were annihilated and is rehabilitated by the JSDF with prosthetic limbs and medical treatment. He then serves as a pivotal person in allowing the JSDF to cross his kingdom and help soldier Yōji Itami defeat the Fire Dragon, and as a member of the pro-imperial coalition against Emperor Zorzal.

Eldant Empire
The Eldant Empire is featured in the Japanese anime series, Outbreak Company.

Petralka Anne Eldant III
Although she is actually a teenage girl with childish face, she is a reigning empress of the Eldant Empire following her parents' mutual deaths. Petralka starts developing her deep feelings for Shinichi Kanō, the hardcore otaku, after having him read manga for her but has initially been jealous of his half-elven maid, Myusel Fourant, due to her close relationship with Shinichi and how well she has learned to speak and write in Japanese. She ultimately attempts to capture Shinichi's attention, asking him to teach her the Japanese language as well and not wanting to fall behind a "lowly peasant". Her cousin Garius En Cordobal, the gay knight and captain of her imperial guards, becomes interested in some yaoi manga and develops his crush on Shinichi after being influenced by Minori Koganuma.

Elfhame
Elfhame is featured in The Folk of the Air series of books by Holly Black.

High King Carden and High Queen Jude succeeded Cardan's father High King Eldred. The monarchs have a special magical connection to the land. 
Jude is not a queen consort, but a co-monarch.

Kingdom of Elfrieden
The Kingdom of Elfrieden is the primary setting of the Japanese light novel series, How a Realist Hero Rebuilt the Kingdom.

Albert Elfrieden
Although not technically part of the royal family, he is the former king of the Kingdom of Elfrieden under the marriage of Queen Elisha Elfrieden, regarded as a friendly, yet overall weak, monarch. In order to satisfy the demands of the Gran Chaos Empire for either supporting funds or a summoned hero, King Albert orders the summoning which brought Kazuya Souma to the world. Then, after seeing Kazuya's initial plans, he abdicates the throne to him and arranges for his daughter Princess Liscia to be married to Kazuya.
Liscia Elfrieden
She is the tomboyish crown princess of the Kingdom of Elfrieden who becomes the primary queen, with Kazuya as her king, following her father's abdication. Together, Liscia and Kazuya have to annex the Principality of Amidonia into their nation to create the Kingdom of Friedonia after the One Week War. Liscia, however, is very tolerant of Kazuya's philandering, even encouraging him to take more wives such as Roroa, princess of Amidonia, Aisha Udgard, daughter of the elven chief, and Juna Doma, granddaughter of the duchess, though she remains adamant about wanting to remain the first wife.

Elusia
Elusia is a kingdom in the fictional continent of Elyos in the video game, Fire Emblem Engage.

King Hyacinth
He was the cunning ruler of Elusia who worshiped Sombron, the evil Fell Dragon that has been sealed away by the Divine Dragon Lumera one thousand years ago. He sent out his army to attack Lumera's castle, stealing most of her powerful Emblem Rings to revive Sombron. Veyle, the sorceress and the daughter of Sombron (who was actually controlled by him through her evil self), also proceeded to attack Lumera's adopted (and Sombron's biological) child Alear, but Lumera sacrificed herself to save Alear's life. With Lumera's death, Alear assisted the kingdoms of Firene and Brodia against Elusia and later confronted Hyacinth. This, however, did not stop Hyacinth from reviving Sombron as he himself sacrificed King Morion of Brodia and then got eaten up by Sombron. And after Veyle steals all the Emblem Rings to allow her father to corrupt people to his side, Hyacinth's daughter Princess Ivy decides to join Alear and gives them two Emblem Rings.

Empire of the Isles
Jessamine Kaldwin (voiced by April Stewart) is the empress of the capital of the Empire of the Isles, Dunwall, the lover of Corvo Attano and the mother of Princess Emily Kaldwin in the Dishonored video game series.

Enchancia
Enchancia is a major setting in the Disney Junior animated series, Sofia the First. It is ruled by the House of Winslow.

King Gideon Winslow IV was the previous ruler of Enchancia who ordered the guards to chase the trolls, who were banging clubs outside his castle, back under the cave and banish them there for three generations. But his wife mistakenly took the Crown of the Gnomes (aka the Crown of Blossoms), a magical tiara in which used for the kingdom's annual Festival of Plenty.
King Roland Winslow I (voiced by Travis Willingham) succeeded his father Gideon as he was considered to be one of the best kings Enchancia has ever had, but put his heroics above his family life, and later had his widow Grand Mum to be the grand queen upon his death, although his royal sorcerer Goodwyn the Great saved his life nine and a half times, until their son Roland II ascended the throne.
King Roland Winslow II (also voiced by Travis Willingham) is the current ruler of Enchancia, the father of twins Princess Amber and Prince James and the brother of Duchess Matilda, who in the pilot Once Upon a Princess marries the former cobbler Miranda Cordova to make her his queen, with whom he has a stepdaughter Sofia. He gives Sofia the Amulet of Avalor, a magical necklace in which has been coveted by his royal sorcerer Cedric who wants to use its power to take over the kingdom but fails after falling into an enchanted sleep during the ball.

Endostan
Endostan is a fictional Middle Eastern sultanate in television series Relic Hunter season 3 episode "Star of Nadir".

The Sultan of Endostan (portrayed by Carlo Rota)
He is a widowed monarch of Endostan whose wife Queen Danielle (formerly archaeologist) had died from mysterious circumstances in the desert. He invites Sydney Fox and her assistant Nigel Bailey to attend the queen's funeral. Sydney believes that her friend Danielle was searching for the Star of Nadir, an ancient diamond that was stolen by a thief of Baghdad in 1423 A.D. But despite this, the Sultan commits his daughter Princess Alia to marry Jamal Mustafa, whose father Hakim Mustafa is one of the leading conservative factions. Alia, however, has other plans; she, Sydney and Nigel go looking for the Star of Nadir to finish her stepmother's research, only to discover that Omar, the head of security, is the one responsible for Danielle's death and has been working for Hakim. The trio return to the palace to give the Star to the Sultan as Jamal turns against his father.

Equestria
Leading Equestria are five powerful regnant coregency princesses from the My Little Pony: Friendship Is Magic franchise.

Princess Celestia, the Princess of the Day and Joy.
Princess Luna, the Princess of the Night and Dreams.
Princess Cadence, the Princess of Love and Family.
Princess Twilight Sparkle, the Princess of Magic and Friendship.
Princess Flurry Heart, the Princess of Light and Hope.

Empire of Erebonia
The Empire of Erebonia is part of the fictional continent of Zemuria in the video game, The Legend of Heroes: Trails of Cold Steel.

Emperor Eugent Reise Arnor III
He is the ruler of the Empire of Erebonia who resides at the Valflame Palace with his consort Empress Priscilla in the empire's capital, Heimdallr, and he has been presumably assassinated by the cursed Ash Carbide in Trails of Cold Steel III but manages to survive his injuries in Trails of Cold Steel IV. Eugent is the father of Prince Olivert and the stepfather of Crown Prince Cedric and Princess Alfin.

Erebor/Lonely Mountain
Thrór, King of Erebor ("the Lonely Mountain") who is mentioned in the novel The Hobbit by J. R. R. Tolkien and appears in its film adaptation. He is the grandfather of Thorin Oakenshield.

Kingdom of Erusea
The Kingdom of Erusea (formerly the Federal Republic of Erusea) restores its monarchy in the video game, Ace Combat 7: Skies Unknown, ruled by the D'Elise royal family.

Rosa Cossette D'Elise
She is a defensive princess and heir who is set to become a ruler of the Kingdom of Erusea following the death of her father King D'Elise. Cossette has been convinced by the militaristic factions within her kingdom's armed forces that the International Space Elevator is declared war on the Osean Federation that seek to command the continent of Usea as with its 48th president, Vincent Harling, wanting to destroy the entire space elevator. After discovering that she has been misled, Princess Cossette joins the aircraft mechanic, Avril Mead, in sabotaging the space elevator and ending the Lighthouse War. Her middle name "Cossette" is an alternate spelling of "Cosette", the name of the heroine in Les Misérables.

Estrovia
King Igor Shahdov (portrayed by Charlie Chaplin) comes from his kingdom of Estrovia to New York City, deposed by the revolution, in the film A King in New York.

Euphrania
Euphrania is a small European kingdom in The Slipper and the Rose, a musical retelling of "Cinderella".

The King and Queen of Euphrania (portrayed by Michael Hordern and Lally Bowers)
The rulers of Euphrania who want a political alliance to prevent the neighboring country of Carolsveld from making war on them and have arranged for their son Prince Edward to marry Carolsveld's princess, Selena. But Edward repeatedly denounces arranged marriage for he only prefers to marry for love, so the advised King suggests that the royal ball is the perfect way to help him choose his bride. His nephew the Duke of Montague is delighted, and Edward has no choice but to accept. At the ball, however, Prince Edward dances with ragged servant Cinderella instead of an actual princess. This later causes the King to send the Lord Chamberlain to convey Cinderella, stating that the prince can only marry a neighboring princess to protect Euphrania against war. But in the end, the fairy godmother convinces the King and Queen to change the law so that Edward can marry Cinderella, as with the Duke and the chosen bride getting married to fulfill the alliance.

Land of Ev
The Land of Ev is featured on the Oz novel series by L. Frank Baum.

King Evoldo was the previous ruler of the Land of Ev who was a cruel despot as he sold his wife, the Queen of Ev, and his five sons and five daughters to the Nome King in exchange for a longer life after purchasing the clockwork man Tik-Tok.
Princess Langwidere, Evoldo's vain and spoiled niece, has taken the throne as the regent of the Land of Ev and has a collection of thirty interchangeable heads that she keeps in a cabinet studded with gems. She switches her heads, instead of her clothing, to match her current state of mood whenever she pleases.
King Evardo XV, eldest of Evoldo's ten children, becomes a new and current ruler of the Land of Ev after his cousin Langwidere is relieved to give up the throne to him.

F

Holy Kingdom of Faerghus
The Holy Kingdom of Faerghus is part of the fictional continent of Fódlan in the video game, Fire Emblem: Three Houses, and its spinoff, Fire Emblem Warriors: Three Hopes.

King Lambert Egitte Blaiddyd (voiced by Patrick Seitz)
He was the ruler of the Holy Kingdom of Faerghus who chose Anselma von Arundel (one of Emperor Ionius's consorts), who fled the Adrestian Empire with her brother Lord Volkhard and her daughter Princess Edelgard, to be his queen under the alias of "Lady Patricia" during the Insurrection of the Seven. Lambert eventually died during the ensuing slaughter after the Tragedy of Duscur. He was the father of Crown Prince Dimitri.
Rufus Blaiddyd
Originally granted the title of Grand Duke of Itha, he assumed the role of the regent of the Holy Kingdom of Faerghus as his nephew Dimitri was too young to inherit the throne after the death of his younger brother Lambert. It is mentioned that Rufus's temporary reign was jeopardized by rumors that he was complicit with the Tragedy of Duscur to claim the throne for himself as well as being a womanizer.
Dimitri Alexandre Blaiddyd (voiced by Chris Hackney)
Formerly the crown prince, he becomes the new king of the Holy Kingdom of Faerghus after the fall of the Garreg Mach Monastery. He provides Saint Seiros (aka Archbishop Rhea) and the remaining Knights of Seiros asylum as they do battle with his stepsister "Emperor" Edelgard and her empire for years, with Byleth Eisner eventually tipping the scale of the war decisively in favor of the Adrestian Empire, before Dimitri has been defeated in battle and then dies (ending varies). Dimitri is also the leader of the Blue Lion House at the Officers Academy.

Fantastica/Fantasia
The Childlike Empress, ruler of Fantastica in the novel The Neverending Story by Michael Ende (ruler of Fantasia in the film adaptation).

Kingdom of Far Far Away
The Kingdom of Far Far Away is featured in DreamWorks' Shrek franchise. It is a parody of Hollywood, California.

King Harold (voiced by John Cleese) was the ruler of the Kingdom of Far Far Away, the late father of Princess Fiona and the father-in-law of Shrek. He was originally a frog who just became a human king but was later changed back by the Fairy Godmother.
Queen Lillian (voiced by Julie Andrews) is the widowed dowager of the Kingdom of Far Far Away, mother of Princess Fiona and mother-in-law of Shrek, and also the leader of the pack of Princesses.

Faria
Faria is an archduchy featured in the White Knight Chronicles video game series.

Archduke Dalam (voiced by Michael Ensign)
He was the previous ruler of Faria who had been in a large conflict with the Kingdom of Balandor since its queen Floraine was killed supposedly by the Farian assassin (who was actually the evil Demian "Sarvain" Ledom of the Magi). But after the war, King Valtos of Balandor came to Dalam with his proposal of peace to be held during the 18th birthday of his daughter Princess Cisna for which he accepted. During the ball, however, Dalam sacrificed himself to save his daughter Princess Miu from a knife that Magi commander Belcitane threw at her. He died happily, knowing peace could come between two nations as he gave Miu a royal crest.
Archduchess Miu (voiced by Natalie Lander)
Formerly a princess, she becomes a new ruler of Faria after her father Dalam's tragic death. Her planned coronation to become an archduchess has been intervened by the Farian Civil War when she falls victim of assassination. She has been aided by dancer Kara who disguises herself as the male general Scardigne to escape to safety until she is found and rescued by Leonard and his team. With their help, Miu establishes peace in her lands. After finally becoming the reigning archduchess, she forms an alliance with the newly crowned Queen Cisna to attack the Magi (now the reborn Yshrenian Empire).

Ferelden
Ferelden is featured in the Dragon Age series of video games, and the setting of the first game, Dragon Age: Origins. For hundreds of years, it has been ruled by members of the Theirin family.

 Calenhad Theirin, the Silver Knight, the first king of united Ferelden.
 Moira the Rebel Queen, who fought to reclaim the throne after the neighboring empire of Orlais conquered Ferelden in the Blessed Age.
 Maric, Moira's son, who became king in exile after his mother was killed during the rebellion and eventually reclaimed Ferelden's independence in the early years of the Dragon Age.
 Cailan, Maric's son, who became king following Maric's disappearance at sea.
 Anora, Cailan's wife, who ruled after his death at the beginning of the Fifth Blight. Her solo reign was overshadowed by her father Loghain's enforced regency.

Kingdom of Fiore
The Kingdom of Fiore is the main setting of the Japanese anime series, Fairy Tail.

Toma E. Fiore is the former king of the Kingdom of Fiore who disguises himself as Mato, the pumpkin mascot of his kingdom's annual Grand Magic Games tournament. Following the battle with the Alvarez Empire, he relinquishes his position to his daughter Princess Hisui.
Hisui E. Fiore, the former princess, becomes the reigning queen of the Kingdom of Fiore after her father's abdication following the war with the Alvarez Empire.

Fire Nation
The Fire Nation is featured in the Avatar: The Last Airbender franchise. The ruler of the Fire Nation holds the title of "Fire Lord" and is the head of a royal family in which the Fire Lord's children are known as "princes" and "princesses".

Sozin, the Fire Lord who started the Fire Nation's war against the other nations.
Azulon, the son of Sozin.
Ozai, the son of Azulon. He is the Fire Lord during most of the original animated television series, Avatar: The Last Airbender.
Zuko, the son of Ozai, becomes Fire Lord after his father is defeated by Avatar Aang.
Izumi, the daughter of Zuko. She appears in the fourth season of the sequel series, The Legend of Korra.

Florin
Florin is the main setting of The Princess Bride by William Goldman. Its royal family appears more in the novel than in its film adaptation.

King Lotharon, the elderly monarch, is declared to be terminally ill near the beginning of the book.
Queen Bella, the king's second wife, is the most beloved person in the kingdom and has an excellent relationship with her stepson.
Prince Humperdinck, heir to the throne, has to get married and wants the most beautiful woman in the world for his wife. He is crowned king after his father's death, although this turns out to be a dream sequence; the king is actually still alive during the entire story.

Floravia
Princess Amelia (voiced by Erica Lindbeck) is crowned to be a reigning queen of the European kingdom of Floravia and a look-alike of Barbie in the animated film, Barbie: Princess Adventure.

Flutterfield
Flutterfield is a small butterfly fairy kingdom on an island, cut off from mainland Fairytopia, in the animated film, Barbie: Mariposa, and its sequel, Barbie: Mariposa & the Fairy Princess.

Queen Marabella (voiced by Jane Barr)
The rightful ruler of Flutterfield whose magical glimmering lights protect her kingdom from the fairy-hunting creatures called the Skeezites, but she was poisoned by her evil servant Henna, causing her lights to dim gradually. Her son, Prince Carlos, is initially being hunted down by the guards to be locked in prison for "his own protection". Marabella is soon revived by Mariposa and her allies, Willa, Rayna and Rayla, with the antidote to the Ilios poison.

G

Galactic Empire
Multiple fictional works are set in the Galactic Empire.

Novels by Isaac Asimov
Emperor Frankeen I, the first monarch of the Galactic Empire.
Emeror Loris VI
Emperor Aburanis, who introduces the "Law Codes of Aburanis".
Emperor Kandar V
Emperor Agis VI, followed by the Entun dynasty ca. 11,830 GE.
Emperor Manowell, also known as the "Bloody Emperor".
Emperor Stannel VI, the father of Cleon I.
Emperor Cleon I, the last emperor of the Entun dynasty.
Emperor Agis XIV, the third cousin of Cleon I.
Emperor Daluben IV, who reigns during the time of the Seldon Trial.
Emperor Stannel VII, who died in 104 FE.
Emperor Ammenetic the Great, mentioned in Foundation and Empire.
Emperor Cleon II, the last strong emperor of the Galactic Empire.
Emperor Dagobert VIII, the final monarch of the Galactic Empire.
Emperor Dagobert IX, the last emperor who flees the Great Sack of Trantor in 260 FE.

Star Wars
Emperor Palpatine, ruler of the Galactic Empire in the Star Wars franchise.

Principality of Gallia
The Principality of Gallia is a main setting in the Valkyria Chronicles video game series. It is ruled by the archduke or archduchess and largely based on the Low Countries.

Marquis Maurits von Borge (voiced by Dwight Schultz)
He was the viceroy and the prime minister of the Principality of Gallia who was appointed as a regent against the claim to the throne of young Princess Cordelia; Borge took the opportunity to dethrone the previous Archduke of Gallia after leading secretly a rebellious group of nobles. He proclaimed that Cordelia was much too young and less experienced in politics and manipulated the events behind the scenes. He even attempted to manipulate the course of the war with both the Federation and the Empire using his influence. He was eventually killed at the hands of Maximilian, the imperial prince of the Empire.
Cordelia gi Randgriz (voiced by Kate Higgins)
In the first game Valkyria Chronicles, she is the former crown princess of the Principality of Gallia who ascends the throne after her parents' deaths, as a scion of the House of Randgriz, although she has not been formally crowned due to her young age. She had her Viceroy Borge acting as a true ruler of Gallia. However, as a rightful heiress, she began to change her demeanor after a kidnapping attempt and then became more self-confident as a leader. Cordelia later becomes the archduchess of Gallia in the sequel Valkyria Chronicles II but has been taken captive by the generalissimo, Count Gilbert Gassenarl, after being forced to fight in a civil war against the Gallian Revolutionary Army. However, she is saved by the Army and then leads personally the navy to win their final battle against Gilbert's son, Baldren Gassenarl. And after his defeat, Archduchess Cordelia has the remaining rebel surrender.

Kingdom of Gallowmere
The Kingdom of Gallowmere is a medieval island country in the MediEvil video game series and its comic adaptation, MediEvil: Fate's Arrow.

King Peregrin
He was the last monarch of the Kingdom of Gallowmere who ascended the throne when he was a teenager after his father, the previous King, choked to death on a piece of undercooked turnip. Under his reign, Peregrin prospered his kingdom for fifty years until a famine forced him to hire a new court magician, the evil sorcerer Zarok. However, Zarok plotted to overthrow the king and take over Gallowmere with his army of zombies and demons, sparking the Battle of Gallowmere. Although Peregrin won the battle, his champion Sir Daniel Fortesque was struck down by an arrow, thus making him the first to fall in the battle. Soon after Daniel was buried, King Peregrin declared him the "Hero the Gallowmere" not too long before he passed away. A hundred years later, Peregrin's ghost aids the resurrected Daniel in a quest to defeat Zarok who now casts a spell over the kingdom to plunge it into eternal night and steal the souls of the living.

Galra Empire
The Galra Empire is featured in the Netflix animated series, Voltron: Legendary Defender, a part of the Voltron franchise.

Emperor Zarkon (in Japanese known as Emperor Daibazaal) 
He was a ruthless and powerful sovereign of the Galra Empire, ruler of Daibazaal and formerly the Black Paladin of Voltron. He recovered all five Lions and wanted one for himself. Eventually, Zarkon has been killed by his son Lotor after 10,000 years of reigning his empire. In the original anime series, he was originally known as King Zarkon, the ruler of Planet Doom.
Prince Lotor (in Japanese known as Prince Imperial Sincline) 
He was the heir to the throne of the Galra Empire who became its crowned emperor after his father's death. As an antihero, Lotor would join with the Voltron Force after his father Zarkon banished him from his empire. He later killed his father to ascend the throne as the "Blood Emperor" but has ultimately been defeated by Voltron and abandoned to die in the Quintessence, comprising the barrier between realities.

Gardania
Gardania is a European kingdom in the animated film, Barbie: Princess Charm School.

Queen Isabella and King Reginald 
The previous rulers of Gardania. They were killed in a car accident planned by Dame Devin, the evil teacher at Princess Charm School who wants to rule their kingdom, when their daughter Sophia was a baby, leaving her an orphan.
Princess Sophia/Blair Willows
The lost princess of Gardania. She was raised under the name "Blair Willows" after a woman found her on the doorstep of her apartment. She later goes to Princess Charm School and through a portrait she sees and a fight against Dame Devin. Blair and her close friends Princesses Isla and Hadley discover she is, in fact, Princess Sophia. Following the defeat of Dame Devin, Sophia becomes a new and rightful ruler of Gardania.

Genovia
Genovia is featured in the book The Princess Diaries by Meg Cabot and its film adaptations.

King Rupert Renaldi
Queen Clarisse Renaldi
Prince Philippe Renaldi (pretender)
Queen Mia Thermopolis Renaldi

Genua
Genua is featured in the Discworld series of novels by Terry Pratchett.

Tacticus, who conquered a vast empire for his native Ankh-Morpork, was installed as King of Genua after the extinction of the old royal bloodline due to interbreeding (its last King having tried to continue it with himself) as the rulers of Ankh-Morpork wished to dispose of him in a respectful manner. Upon becoming King, Tacticus attacked Ankh-Morpork, which he identified as the greatest threat to Genua, bringing about the end of its empire. Tacticus has been dead for two-thousand years prior to the start of the series.
Baron Saturday, appearing in Witches Abroad, had been murdered prior to the events of the novel by Lady Lilith de Tempscire, a fairy godmother obsessed with narrative magic. He spends his afterlife as a zombie in the service of Mrs. Erzulie Gogol, a voodoo witch and his former lover. He is analogous with Baron Samedi.
Ella Saturday becomes the Duchess of Genua in Witches Abroad. Also known as Emberella, she is the Discworld's version of Cinderella, with Lily having planned for her to marry the Duc, a frog-prince.

Germa Kingdom
The Germa Kingdom (also known as the Kingdom of Science) is a seafaring kingdom in the Japanese anime series, One Piece. It is ruled by the Vinsmoke family.

Vinsmoke Judge
He is the widowed king of the Germa Kingdom and the surpreme commander of the military branch, the Germa 66, whose wife Queen Sora had died sometime during the childhood of their son the former prince Sanji. As a skilled scientist, he is also the former member of MADS where he was a research partner for the leading scientist, Dr. Vegapunk. Although initially fighting over Sanji for his hatred, King Judge and the rest of his children Princess Reiju and Princes Ichiji, Niji and Yonji become allies of both the Straw Hat Pirates and the Fire Tank Pirates after realizing Charlotte Lilin of the Big Mom Pirates deceives and intends to assassinate them.

Gerolstein
Gerolstein is a fictional grand duchy in the comic opera, La Grande-Duchesse de Gérolstein.

The Grand Duchess of Gerolstein
She is a titular character who is the spoiled but charming young tyrant of Gerolstein and whose tutor and court chamberlain Baron Puck brings her up to have her own way. Owing to her being in an unhappy state of mind over the affair, Puck generates a war to amuse her. Although she is betrothed to the foppish Prince Paul, the Grand Duchess falls desperately in love with soldier Fritz but discovers that he has already been engaged to marry Wanda, leading her to conspire to assassinate him upon his return from the wedding ceremony. However, the Duchess becomes philosophic and decides to give up on Fritz and marry Prince Paul after all, learning that she cannot always get her way.

Kingdom of Glenbrook
The Kingdom of Glenbrook is part of the fictional continent of Norzelia in the video game, Triangle Strategy.

King Regna Glenbrook (voiced by Daniel Riordan)
He was the powerful ruler of the Kingdom of Glenbrook during the Saltiron War, a conflict between his kingdom, the Grand Duchy of Aesfrost and the Holy State of Hyzante. Regna was contacted and asked by Archduke Zigmunt Aesfrost for an alliance with him, regarding passage into Hyzante respond to its monopoly over salt. He agreed to allow Zigmunt's army to pass through his land, for in which case both Glenbrook and Aesfrost must maintain joint control over the source once they conquer Hyzante. As the Aesfrosti army marched on Hyzante, however, Symon Wolffort, one of Glenbrook's warriors sought out by the hierophant, drove their forces back. After meeting in secret with Symon, Regna agreed with him to withdraw themselves from the war and demanded Aesfrost and Hyzante to do the same, leading them to cease their fighting. He then split the Wolffort clan into three noble houses, House Wolffort, House Telliore and House Falkes.
Prince Roland Glenbrook (voiced by Alan Lee)
He becomes a sole surviving heir to the throne when Archduke Zigmunt's son, Gustadolph, invades the Kingdom of Glenbrook, killing his father Regna and older brother Prince Frani and capturing his younger sister Princess Cordelia in response to the assassination of Gustadolph's cousin Dragan in the Grand Norzelian Mine. Soon after his escape with House Wolffort, Roland has been handed over by his childhood friend and Symon's son, Serenoa Wolffort, to Gustadolph in order to bring all of his kingdom to heel. But Roland is freed shortly after through Cordelia's grace and returns to House Wolffort to drive Aesfrost from Glenbrook. He goes about trying to rebuild his kingdom along with Serenoa, Gustadolph's half-sister Princess Frederica, and bannerman Benedict Pascal. However, he is met with the cruel reality of being the new king as he executes all of his nobles for misappropriating reconstruction funds.

Gondor
Isildur was a previous king of Gondor in the novel The Lord of the Rings by J. R. R. Tolkien.
Aragorn, descendant of Isildur, becomes King Elessar of Gondor.

Gran Chaos Empire
The Gran Chaos Empire is featured in the Japanese light novel series, How a Realist Hero Rebuilt the Kingdom.

Maria Euphoria
Better known as the Saint, Maria is the empress of the Gran Chaos Empire. She is the idealistic opposite to Kazuya Souma, king of Elfrieden, having held up the Declaration of Mankind's Common Front Against the Demon Race, or simply, the Mankind Declaration. After the One Week War and the annexation of the Principality of Amidonia, Empress Maria and King Kazuya forge a secret alliance in order to prepare for a full-on war with the Demon Lord's Domain. Maria is the older sister of Princesses Jeanne and Trill Euphoria.

Duchy of Grand Fenwick
The Duchy of Grand Fenwick is a tiny nation located in the Alps in The Mouse That Roared novel series by Leonard Wibberley and its film adaptations. Its name is taken from Sir Roger Fenwick, the English knight who settled and founded there in 1370.

Duchess Gloriana XII
She is a ruler of the Duchy of Grand Fenwick who has started reigning in her young age (in the manner of young Queen Elizabeth II and Princess Grace) and whose prime minister, Count Rupert Mountjoy, plans to save her country's economy by declaring war on the United States of America after its company in California throws a copycat product on the market over the duchy's trademark, Pinot Grand Fenwick wine, leading the statelet to be threatened by bankruptcy. She lists her terms, with the world at her country's mercy, that all nuclear weapons must go through an inspection by impartial scientists. During the triumphant outcome of the war, Gloriana marries Field Marshal Tully Bascomb until he eventually dies for some time in The Mouse that Saved the West. In the film adaptation, Duchess Gloriana was portrayed as a parody of Queen Victoria who wears mourning for her "missing" consort Prince Louis of Bosnia-Herzegovina, thinks that the current U.S. president is Calvin Coolidge and owns the only motorcar in her duchy, the 1920s hand-cranked model. She is later succeeded by the new ruler, Duchess Gloriana XIII, in the sequel The Mouse on the Moon.

Duchy of Gransys
The Duchy of Gransys is a main setting of the video game, Dragon's Dogma.

Edmun Dragonsbane (aka The Wyrmking) (voiced by Alan Shearman)
He was the ageless duke who ruled the Duchy of Gransys for many years after conquering an evil dragon, Grigori. He, however, had not slain a dragon but had accepted its bargain and sacrificed his beloved in exchange for power sufficient to sate any desire. He and his subjects, even the Arisen, then lost their immortality upon defeating the Dragon. Edmun had several wives, including Lady Aelinor from Meloire, although he had no heir and none of his family was known to be alive. Duke Edmun's false claim to have killed the Dragon is obviously inspired by that of King Casiodorus's in the film Dragonslayer.

Graustark
Graustark is a fictional Eastern European principality in the series of Ruritanian romance novels by George Barr McCutcheon and its film adaptations.

Prince Ganlook, the previous ruler of Graustark who was killed in a war with the neighboring nation of Axphain in the 1870s.
Princess Yetive, Ganlook's daughter who became a new ruler of Graustark. She was to be a fiancée to Prince Lorenz of Axphain in exchange for payment terms but later married an American man named Grenfall Lorry after Lorenz's death.
Prince Robin, a young prince who was left to rule Graustark after his parents Yetive and Grenfall were killed in a railway accident near Brussels. As an adult, Robin was married to Crown Princess Bevra of Dawsbergen.
Gregory, the illegitimate son of Prince Hedrik of Axphain inherits the throne as he restores the monarchy in Graustark after his exiled brother Prince Hubert was assassinated in the aftermath following World War I.

Dukedom of Greenvale
The Dukedom of Greenvale is a main setting in the Overlord video game spin-off, Overlord: Dark Legend. It is ruled by the Gromgard family.

Duke Gromgard
He is the former ruler of the Dukedom of Greenville, and the father of Lords Gromgard and Grenville and Lady Gerda, who is once mighty but has disgraced his country for his misadventure to acquire some of his lost assets. He returns from his quest empty-handed and finds that his wife Duchess Gromgard had run off with a strong, rich nobleman from another country, leaving him and his castle to fall into disrepair. His older brother Baron Gromgard (aka the Black Baron) was a previous ruler of Greenvale who was speculated that he was the "first" Overlord.

Grünewald
Grünewald is a tiny country within present-day Germany in the novel Prince Otto: A Romance by Robert Louis Stevenson.

Prince Otto Johann Friedrich
He is the prince who rules Grünewald and, upon learning from his people of his ineffectual ability to reign, seeks to better himself and prevent his country from revolution and war. Otto also enters the neighboring country of Gerolstein where he takes shelter for the night under his assumed disguise with farm-owner Killian Gottesheim and his daughter Ottilia and revolutionary Fritz. His unfaithful wife Princess Amalina Seraphina initially plots with Baron Heinrich von Gondremark, the prime minister of Grünewald, to usurp him before she later distrusts the baron and recalls her love for Otto.

Kingdom of Guardia
The Kingdom of Guardia is a main setting of the video game Chrono Trigger.

King Guardia XXI 
He was the 21st monarch of the Kingdom of Guardia during the Middle Ages. His wife, Queen Leene, and right-hand man, the Chancellor, have been kidnapped by the monstrous fiend called Yakra, who planned to cause chaos in his kingdom. The King participated the war between the humans and the fiends but has been injured in battle and was brought back to his castle to heal. Soon after his recovery, the King was asked by Crono and his allies, who travel through time and space, that he safeguards the powerful Rainbow Shell for future generations, so he agreed and had the shell kept as a royal heirloom.
King Guardia XXXIII
He is the 33rd monarch of the Kingdom of Guardia in the Present whose wife Queen Aliza had died of illness shortly after giving birth to their daughter Princess Nadia, who bears a striking resemblance to their ancestor Queen Leene. After Aliza's death, King Guardia has a stricter personality, which Nadia strongly dislikes as she wants to explore the lands under her alias "Marle". With Nadia gone, the King becomes very distressed, not knowing that his daughter is time-traveling with Crono and Lucca and has been put on trial and nearly executed by Yakra XIII, the descendant of the original Yakra.

Gwynedd
Gwynedd is one of the Eleven Kingdoms, ruled by the House of Haldane, in the series of Deryni novels by Katherine Kurtz. It is based on the ancient Welsh kingdom of the same name.

Augarin Alexander Haldane, 1st king of Gwynedd who reigned from 645 to 673.
Aidan Alexander Haldane, 2nd king of Gwynedd, reigned 673 to 698.
Llarik Broccan Haldane, 3rd king of Gwynedd, reigned 698 to 719.
Ryons Gospatric Haldane, 4th king of Gwynedd, reigned 719 to 736.
Bearand Llarik Donal Haldane, 5th king of Gwynedd, reigned 736 to 794.
Ifor Augarin Niall Haldane, 6th king of Gwynedd who reigned from 794 until 822 during the Festillic Coup.
Cinhil Donal Ifor Haldane, 12th king of Gwynedd who was the first of the Haldanes since the Festillic Coup, reigned 904 to 917.
Alroy Bearand Brion Haldane, 13th king of Gwynedd, reigned 917 to 921.
Javan Jashan Urien Haldane, 14th king of Gwynedd, reigned 921 to 922.
Rhys Michael Alister Haldane, 15th king of Gwynedd, reigned 922 to 928.
Owain Javan Cinhil Haldane, 16th king of Gwynedd, reigned 928 to 948.
Uthyr Michael Richard Haldane, 17th king of Gwynedd, reigned 948 to 980.
Nygel Rhys Owain Haldane, 18th king of Gwynedd, reigned 980 to 983.
Jasher Owain Cinhil Haldane, 19th king of Gwynedd, reigned 983 to 985.
Cluim Michael Reginaud Haldane, 20th king of Gwynedd, reigned 985 to 994.
Urien Owain Rhys Michael Haldane, 21st king of Gwynedd, reigned 994 to 1025.
Cinhil Aymeric Nygel Haldane, 22nd king of Gwynedd who shortly reigned in 1025.
Malcolm Congal Aidan Julian Haldane, 23rd king of Gwynedd, reigned 1025 to 1074.
Donal Blaine Aidan Cinhil Haldane, 24th king of Gwynedd, reigned 1074 to 1095.
Brion Donal Cinhil Urien Haldane, 25th king of Gwynedd, reigned 1095 to 1120.
Kelson Cinhil Anthony Haldane, former crown prince and 26th king of Gwynedd who currently reigns since 1120.

H

Helium
Helium is a red Martian kingdom in the Barsoom series of novels by Edgar Rice Burroughs. It is inhabited by the humanoid red Martians whose ruler is known as Jeddak (male) or Jeddara (female).

Jeddak Tardos Mors
He is the ruler of Helium who resides in the greater city, known as Greater Helium. His title "Jeddak" may refer to as either an overlord or a high king in Barsoomian language. His son Mors Kajak is a Jed (prince or king) who rules the lesser city called Lesser Helium. Tardos Mors is the grandfather (or father in the film adaptation) of Princess Dejah Thoris and grandfather-in-law of Warlord John Carter.

Hobeika
The fictional Middle Eastern nation of Hobeika is featured in the French-Tunisian film Black Gold.

Emir Nesib (portrayed by Antonio Banderas) is the reigning sultan of Hobeika who defeated Sultan Amar of Salmaah in a border war to force him to agree to a peace pact, creating a no-man's-land out of a barren strip they called the "Yellow Belt" between their nations. Nesib even forced Amar to trade his sons, Princes Saleh and Auda, as hostages to rear them with his own children, Prince Tariq and Princess Leyla.

Hoshido
Hoshido is the fictional Japanese kingdom in the video game, Fire Emblem Fates.

King Sumeragi was the swordmaster and previous ruler of Hoshido, with his first wife Ikona as its queen, who was tricked and then brutally killed by King Garon of Nohr. He was the father of Princes Ryoma and Takumi and Princesses Hinoka and Sakura and the stepfather of Corrin who has been taken and raised in a secluded fortress in Nohr.
Queen Mikoto was the younger sister of the late Queen Arete of Valla, who became the queen of Hoshido as the second wife of Sumeragi and ascended the throne after his death until she died in a surprise attack by Nohr. Originally a lover to the Dragon King Anankos, Mikoto was the biological mother of Corrin and the maternal aunt of Princess Azura.
Ryoma, the former prince and swordmaster, becomes the new king of Hoshido after his father and stepmother's tragic deaths (ending varies). Ryoma has the son and heir, Shiro, who grew up in a secluded realm.

Hyland
Empress Endora is the monarch of Hyland who, as manipulated by the evil dark wizard Rashidi, conquers all of the other kingdoms, including Zenobia, within the continent of Zetegenia to form the Sacred Zetegenian Empire where she reigns alongside her son Prince Gares, in the video game Ogre Battle: The March of the Black Queen.

Hyrogoth
Hyrogoth is featured in the Disney Channel animated series, Dave the Barbarian.

Zonthara (voiced by Joan Rivers) is the evil sorceress queen of Hyrogoth who keeps on trying to teach her daughter Princess Irmaplotz, the ex-girlfriend of Prince Dave of Udrogoth, to be eviler, although Irmaplotz is half-evil due to Zonthara's late husband, the King of Hyrogoth, being good.

Kingdom of Hyrule
The Kingdom of Hyrule is a primary setting in The Legend of Zelda video game franchise.

King Gustaf was the King of Hyrule during Force Era. He is the earliest king of Hyrule to be known.
King Daltus was the King of Hyrule, alsoduring Force Era. He was the son of Gustaf.
The King of Hyrule was the Hyrulean monarch who reigned the Kingdom of Hyrule in The Adventure of Link.
King Daphnes Nohansen Hyrule was the King of Hyrule during Era Without A Hero. He later became King of Red Lions in The Legend of Zelda: The Wind Waker.
King Rhoam Bosphoramus Hyrule was the King of Hyrule prior to Great Calamity Era.
Princess Zelda is the rightful regnant for the Kingdom of Hyrule. She has many different versions of herself as the law stated throughout the video game series.

Zora Tribe 
Despite having status only as a tribe in the Kingdom of Hyrule, the Zora Tribe also have their own monarch who led the race and a control over Zora's Domain, which is a part of Lanayru Region.

King Zora De Bon XVI was the previous ruler of Zora's Domain and the father of Princess Ruto. There is also the King in The Legend of Zelda: Twilight Princess, who was also named Zora and was the husband of Queen Rutela and father of Prince Ralis.
Queen Oren is the ruler of Zora's Domain and one of the Seven Sages in The Legend of Zelda: A Link Between Worlds.
King Dorephan is the current king of Zora that ruled the tribe for 200 years. He is the father of Princess Mipha and Prince Sidon.

I

Ile-Rien
Ile-Rien is a nation in the fantasy books by Martha Wells. It is ruled by the Fontainon dynasty.

King Fulstan was the previous ruler of Ile-Rien who died in the beginning of the novel The Element of Fire.
Queen Ravenna was King Fulstan's consort and the dowager who was the true ruler of Ile-Rien and maintained the reign of her son Roland, seeing to its stability.
King Roland is a weak monarch of Ile-Rien who reigns with his queen consort Falaise, whom his mother Ravenna selected in hopes that she could make her a fitting successor.
The Fontainon Queen is a descendant of Queen Ravenna and King Fulstan who rules in the novels The Death of the Necromancer and The Fall of Ile-Rien trilogy. She is the mother of Prince Ilaron and Princess Olympe, whom she separates via different routes in fear of being able to make her escape safely during the invasion and conquest.

Illéa 
Illéa is featured in The Selection series of novel by Kiera Cass, following absolute primogeniture.

 King Clarkson Schreave
 King Maxon Schreave
 Queen America Singer (consort)
 Queen Eadlyn

Illyria
Illyria is featured in the Disney+ film, Secret Society of Second-Born Royals.

King Robert (portrayed by Samuel Page) was the previous monarch of Illyria who has been killed by his brother Prince Edmond (aka Inmate 34). He was the late father of Princesses Eleanor and Samantha.
Queen Catherine (portrayed by Élodie Yung) becomes a dowager of Illyria after her husband's tragic death until she takes up the duty to Eleanor.
Crown Princess Eleanor "Ell" (portrayed by Ashley Liao) has been set to become a monarch of Illyria following her father's death. She promises her mother Catherine, younger sister Samantha and the Society that her first order as the new queen is to add parliament to their government.

Incursean Empire
The Incursean Empire is featured in the Ben 10 franchise. The Incurseans are a race of the humanoid frog-like aliens.

Lord Emperor Milleous is the former ruler of the Incursean Empire who seeks help from the team of Alien Force led by Ben Tennyson in rescuing his daughter Attea from the bounty hunter called SevenSeven. Attea, however, has to offer SevenSeven twice the money to dethrone Milleous. But Milleous escapes from the dungeon and reclaims the throne after Attea is defeated by Swampfire. In the television film Ben 10 Versus the Universe: The Movie, Milleous is the Grand Magistrate and a court judge of the Incurseans.
Empress Attea, the former crown princess and military chief, becomes a new ruler of the Incursean Empire after her father Milleous forcefully abdicates the throne and has been taken into Plumber custody. She has SevenSeven to help her dethroning Milleous before, but she has been defeated by Swampfire and imprisoned by her father much to her dismay, along with her mother.

Kingdom of Inderaloka
The Kingdom of Inderaloka is a Malay kingdom featured in a Malaysian animated film, Upin & Ipin: The Lone Gibbon Kris.

 The King of Inderaloka was the ruler prior to its fall to Raja Bersiong. He was the father of Mat Jenin and possessed the Lone Gibbon Kris to be used for kingdom's liberation from Raja Bersiong's evil rule.
 Raja Bersiong became the ruler of the Kingdom of Inderaloka after managed to defeat King of Inderaloka.
 Mat Jenin is the current ruler of the Kingdom of Inderaloka. He is the rightful master of the Lone Gibbon Kris who ascended to the throne after successfully defeating Raja Bersiong.

Insectra Empire
The Insectra Empire is an insect-typed alien nation in the Fleetway Publications comic series, Sonic the Comic.

Dark Visor, the Grand Emperor
The current ruler whose Insectra Empire has fought a 10,000-year war against the rival Blurrgh aliens. Although he claims that he intends to rule the entire galaxy, he also claims not to know why his people are at war with the Blurrgh. He even has indicated a desire, unknown to his people, to continue hostilities against the Blurrgh because of all the perks he gets, like expense accounts and company vehicles. However, when the Insectras and the Blurrgh land on the planet of the Kaamdaarn aliens, Visor's soldiers decide to end the war and settle down in peace, despite his objections that the war was his empire's tradition. He and his grandfather Dim Visor and great-great-grandfather Dusty Visor are a parody of Darth Vader from the Star Wars franchise.

Ishruna
Ishruna is a royal capital city in the Japanese anime series, Life with an Ordinary Guy Who Reincarnated into a Total Fantasy Knockout.

The King of Ishruna
He is a widowed monarch who is overly protective of his daughter Princess Ugraine as he keeps her locked inside the palace all her life since his wife died giving birth to her. The King also explains Hinata Tachibana (a man who is changed into a girl) and her childhood friend Tsukasa Jingūji a prophecy that says the hero summoned by the Goddess of Love is destined to defeat the Demon Lord and his kingdom is obligated to help them.

Land of Ix
The Land of Ix is featured in the novel Queen Zixi of Ix by L. Frank Baum and its film adaptation, The Magic Cloak of Oz.

Queen Zixi
She is an oldest living witch who rules the Land of Ix and, with the use of witchcraft, is able to appear young and beautiful to her subjects, but her reflection in the mirror shows her as old and ugly as she truly is. She learns of the magic cloak from minstrel Quavo and seeks to use it to make her reflection in the mirror as beautiful as she has made herself. To secure the cloak, Zixi disguises herself as the witchcraft teacher named Ms. Trust in which to lure Princess Fluff of Noland as her pupil. When her plan fails, she declares war on Noland, but her army has been defeated by a wish made on the magic cloak. She goes to Noland in disguise again, this time as Adlena who wants to be one of Fluff's serving maids. She then summons imps to make an exact duplicate of the magic cloak and switch it with the real one. When Zixi tries to use the cloak herself, however, its power does not work because she stole it. She realizes that she has been foolish to be unhappy with her lot and later rules her land with kindness and justice.

Izmir
Empress Savina (portrayed by Thora Birch) is a rightful ruler whose empire of Izmir has long been a divided land. She has been overthrown by an elite group of the powerful Mages led by the evil warlock Profion, wishes to hold of the mythical Rod of Savrille that would help her fight Profion, and enlists two thieves, Ridley Freeborn and Snails, for help in the film Dungeons & Dragons.

J

Jade Empire
Emperor Sun Hai is the villainous ruler of the far-eastern Jade Empire in the video game of the same name. He was once a dutiful and honorable monarch until he has become reclusive corrupted by his lust for power. He is the father of Princess Sun Lian (aka Silk Fox).

Jalpur
Jalpur is the fictional Indian kingdom in the Disney Junior animated series, Mira, Royal Detective.

Queen Shanti (voiced by Freida Pinto) is the monarch of Jalpur who appoints Mira to be a royal detective in her kingdom after solving a mystery that involved saving her younger son Prince Neel. Her older son is Crown Prince Veer, the heir apparent who is the aspiring king of Jalpur.

Jamatai
Jamatai is the antagonistic ancient kingdom in the Japanese anime series, Steel Jeeg.

Queen Himika 
The ruler of Jamatai who reawakens from her slumber in the underground after her kingdom's powerful relic, a bronze bell which archaeologist Professor Shiba uses to restore his son Hiroshi Shiba to life by means, rings for the reconquest of the Earth surface. Himika's henchmen have killed the professor in vain pursue of the artifact, leaving his thought to be uploaded on a supercomputer at a defense base. The giant fighting robot, Steel Jeeg, is built to defend modern Japan from the invasion of Himika's army of minions.

Jammbo
The planet Jammbo is governed by King and Queen (actual names) in the Spanish-British animated children's television programme Jelly Jamm.

Jark/Jāku Empire
Emperor Warusa, the evil ruler of the Jark Empire (Jāku Empire in Japanese) who sends his servants Belzeb, Falzeb and Taidar to conquer Earth, in the Japanese anime series Matchless Raijin-Oh.

Jutland
Jutland is a small Danish kingdom in the Valkyria Chronicles video game spin-off, Valkyria Revolution. It is analogous to the Ottoman Empire.

Ophelia Augusta "Fifi" af Jutland (voiced by Eden Riegel)
She is the princess and heir of Jutland who is in charge of sovereignty, although her father the King is an actual reigning monarch. Princess Ophelia joins the "Anti-Valkyria Unit" called Vanargand on the front line to protect her country, alongside her bodyguard and lady-in-waiting Miranda Vilfort and her late brother Executive Officer Godot Vilfort. Her entire kingdom has economically been blockaded by the powerful Ruzhien Empire Ophelia opposes. She is also associated with the infamous Five Traitors led by Vanargand's captain, Amleth Grønkjær, as well as being able to manipulate her powerful song to negate a magical dirge of Brunhilde, the Valkyria.

K

Kanterbury
Kanterbury is a major setting in the video game, Guardian Tales.

Queen Camilla, the ruler of Kanterbury who evacuates her people and assists the Guardian Knight, her younger sister the Little Princess and Knight Captain Eva escape the Dark Magician, the leader of the Invaders who are attacking against Kanterbury. She and Eva ultimately separate the Knight and the Princess before they are both stroke by the Dark Magician.

Karlova
Karlova is featured in the novel The Rider by Edgar Rice Burroughs.

King Constans, the ruler whose kingdom of Karlova has been a rival to the neighboring kingdom of Margoth for centuries and who negotiates a marriage alliance between his son Crown Prince Boris and Princess Mary of Margoth. But Boris has to trait places with a notorious highwayman, the Rider, for a week in order to avoid his father's arranged marriage.

Karlsberg
King Ferdinand of the German kingdom of Karlsberg, the grandfather of Prince Karl Franz, in the operetta The Student Prince.

Katolis
Katolis is part of the fictional continent of Xadia in the Netflix animated series, The Dragon Prince.

King Harrow was the previous, widowed ruler of Katolis whose wife Queen Sarai was killed by Dragon King Avizandum ("Thunder") whom he and his former advisor, the evil dark mage Viren, had to kill in response to that. Harrow was the late father of young Crown Prince Ezran and the stepfather of Prince Callum.
Ezran, the former crown prince, becomes the new King of Katolis after his father's death towards the end of Season 2 and by the beginning of Season 3.

Khemed
Mohammed Ben Kalish Ezab is the reigning emir of the fictional Arabian country of Khemed in the Tintin comics, which appears to be located upon the Red Sea.

Kingdom of Khura'in
The Kingdom of Khura'in is featured in the video game, Phoenix Wright: Ace Attorney − Spirit of Justice.

Amara Sigatar Khura'in was Queen until an attempted assassination was carried out on her by her sister, Ga'ran. Although she survived the assassination attempt, it was officially announced that she had died, resulting in Ga'ran taking her place as the Queen of Khura'in. In reality her life was being used to benefit her sister's malicious needs, including acting as leverage over her children and husband's lives for the next 20 plus years. She survives yet another attempt on her life by Ga'ran during the game's events.
Ga'ran Sigatar Khura'in became the Queen after her sister was supposedly "assassinated". She is best known for having formed the culture of Khura'in into one that displays a powerful prejudice towards defense attorneys, and ultimately leading an attorney genocide involving mass slaughter and imprisonment of Khura'in's lawyers. She is ultimately found to have never had an actual claim to the throne, and is found to be guilty of a multitude of charges.
Rayfa Padma Khura'in, the daughter of Queen Amara and Dhurke Sahdmadhi, niece and adoptive daughter of Queen Ga'ran, and crown princess of Khura'in. As the next in line to the throne, she is to become the reigning Queen following the dethroning and subsequent arrest of her Ga'ran. However, due to her inability to as of yet channel spirits, which is a requirement for a monarch in Khura'in, a regent is temporarily appointed.
Nahyuta Sahdmadhi, the son of Queen Amara and Dhurke Sahdmadhi, and Queen Ga'ran's nephew. After Princess Rayfa ascends to the throne, he becomes a regent due to his sister's as of yet incapability to become the ruling monarch.

Kimlasca-Lanvaldear
Kimlasca-Lanvaldear (or Kimlasca for short) is the sovereign nation in the video game, Tales of the Abyss.

King Ingobert VI
The king of Kimlasca-Lanvaldear who adopts an archer girl named Meryl Oakland (aka Natalia Luzu Kimlasca-Lanvaldear) taking her to replace a stillborn Kimlascan princess. His kingdom fights with the Malkuth Empire over the fragments of a prophecy called the "Score", hoping to discover and fulfill the future. He is the uncle of Luke fon Fabre, son of his sister Duchess Susanne, who is the identical "replica" of a God-General, Asch.

Kinmoku
Kinmoku is featured in the Sailor Moon franchise.

Princess Kakyuu (also known as Princess Fireball in English) 
She is the ruler and future queen of Kinmoku who flees to Earth after her homeland was destroyed by Shadow Galactica. 
In manga, Kakyuu is the guardian of Kinmoku who has been hiding the incense burner held by young Chibi-Chibi and transforms into "Sailor Kakyuu" so that she can fight alongside the other Sailor Guardians against evil; she is one of the galaxy princesses who is in charge of the Sailor Guardians, along with Princess Serenity/Sailor Moon and Small Lady/Sailor Chibi Moon. 
In anime, Kakyuu goes to Earth to find the "Light of Hope" that can defeat villainess Sailor Galaxia. In fear of Galaxia, she is found and protected by Chibi-Chibi and hides in an incense burner. Her three gendergueer assistants, Sailor Starlights, play the pop music to reach her, but not to avail as she still remains hidden from Galaxia until she is eventually released when she rescues Sailor Moon from a black hole. Kakyuu then recognizes Chibi-Chibi as the Light of Hope right before she dies. She, however, is revived by the reformed Galaxia's healing and returns home with Sailor Starlights to rebuild Kinmoku.

Kippernium
Kippernium is the fictional English kingdom in the children's book series Jane and the Dragon by Martin Baynton and its animated television series adaptation.

King Rathbonne "Caradoc" Cedric Bartok Kippernook
Caradoc is the good-humored and childish ruler of the small kingdom of Kippernium. He is the younger brother of the previous monarch, the real "King Caradoc", whom he keeps the name so his people can remember him after his death before crowning. His children, Prince Cuthbert Hakan and Princess Lavinia Pernilla Kippernook, seem to be more mature than he is. However, it is common to hear insight and wisdom come from his lips when the need arises. After Prince Cuthbert is rescued and brought back from a dragon by the adolescent protagonist, Jane Turnkey, Caradoc makes her a knight apprentice for her bravery.

Kivukiland
King Hekule (portrayed by Tongayi Chirisa) is the ruler of the Southern African kingdom of Kivukiland who has been cursed by a gemstone to be possessed by the spirit of Kunji Balanadin, in the South African film sequel Mr. Bones 2: Back from the Past.
King Tsonga (portrayed by Fats Bookholane) is the new ruler of Kivukiland who longs for a son to be the heir to the throne, in the first film Mr Bones.

Kingdom of Klantol
The Kingdom of Klantol is featured in the video game, Shining Soul II.

King Marcel and Queen Yvonne
The rulers of the Kingdom of Klantol who possess the crystal in which reflects the current balance of light and darkness, only when it turns from shining to cloudy as the light becomes too strong. Their most trusted knight, Deatharte, becomes corrupted by darkness after eating the forbidden fruit left by Gillespie, the alchemist of the Chaos Knights. Deatharte pretends to obey King Marcel to search for his daughter Princess Camille who has been abducted by an army of goblins, but instead joins in the Chaos Knights. Because of this, Marcel later relies upon the young hero who learns that the goblins are taking Camille to the evil witch Wizari. After the defeat of Wizari and the Chaos Knights, however, a destructive power called Chaos is awakened by a violent shift in balance from darkness to light and spirits away the royal family until the hero rescues them and restores balance to the world.

Known Universe
Shaddam IV, the Emperor of the Known Universe in the novel Dune, the first book in the Dune franchise by Frank Herbert.
Paul Atreides, the Emperor of the Known Universe in the novel Dune Messiah.
Leto II Atreides, the Emperor of the Known Universe in the novel God Emperor of Dune.

Kukuanaland
Kukuanaland is featured in the novel King Solomon's Mines by Sir H. Rider Haggard and its adaptations in other media.

King Twala was an African monarch of Kukuanaland who had to murder his brother the previous king and drive his brother's wife and son, Ignosi, out to the desert to die. He ruled over his people, the Kukuanas, with ruthless violence until he was overthrown by the rebels of Ignosi and had his head lopped off by Sir Henry Curtis in a duel.
King Ignosi (aka Umbopa) is the rightful monarch of Kukuanaland whose allies Allan Quatermain, Sir Henry Curtis and Captain Good gain support for him, as the rebellion breaks out, by taking the advantage of their foreknowledge of a lunar eclipse to claim that they would black out the moon as proof of his claim.

Kuntala
King Jaya Varma was the ruler of Kuntala Kingdom and the brother of Princess Devasena in the Baahubali franchise. His entire kingdom was destroyed by King Bhallaladeva of Mahishmati, so he formed a rebellious group to free his sister. However, Jaya Varma was killed by Bhallaladeva in the war.

Kyrat
King Pagan Min (originally named Gang Min) is the eccentric and violent tyrant of the fictional Himalayan country of Kyrat and the adoptive brother of Yuma Lau in the video game Far Cry 4. He renamed himself after a historical Burmese king when his father died.

L

Lancre
Lancre is featured in the Discworld series of novels by Terry Pratchett.

Ynci the Short-Tempered is mentioned in Lords and Ladies as a legendary founding monarch of Lancre, her portrait inspiring the prospective Queen Magrat to fight off an Elvish invasion. Ynci is in fact fictional, her armour that Magrat dons being made from cookware only a few generations old. She is a parody of Boudica.
Champot was the King of Lancre about a thousand years before the events of Wyrd Sisters who built the traditional royal residence of Lancre Castle and was killed by beheading at the hands of his nephew. His ghost (whose head is often separated from his body) mentors the recently assassinated King Verence on the nature of ghosts.
Ronald III is mentioned in Witches Abroad as being a particularly unpleasant monarch, the reason why 'Ronald' in Lancre is rhyming slang for 'turd'.
Lully I is mentioned in Lords and Ladies as something of a historian and a romantic, responsible for creating the fiction of Ynci including commissioning a portrait of her.
Gurnt the Stupid is mentioned in Lords and Ladies as having unsuccessfully attempted to establish an aerial attack force using ravens.
My-God-He's-Heavy I is mentioned in Carpe Jugulum in relation to the Lancrastrian tradition of people being called exactly what the priest says at their Christening.
Griminir the Impaler is mentioned in Wyrd Sisters and Carpe Jugulum as being Lancre's only vampiric monarch, living off blue steak to avoid drinking blood but nevertheless shed blood during her reign. She reigned from 1514-1553, 1553-1557, 1557-1562, 1562-1567, and 1568-1573.
Queen Bemery was mentioned in Wyrd Sisters as having reigned from 670-722.
Thargum was mentioned in Wyrd Sisters as a previous king poisoned by Verence I’s father.
Gruneberry the Good is mentioned in Wyrd Sisters, having ruled from 906-967.
Verence I was the King of Lancre in Wyrd Sisters whereupon he was murdered by his cousin, Duke Felmet.
Duke Felmet was the ruler of Lancre during the events of Wyrd Sisters during which time he mistreated both the land and his subjects.
Verence II has been the King of Lancre since the events of Wyrd Sisters. The former court fool, he was crowned King after the refusal of Tomjon (Verence I's supposed heir) to become King at the expense of his acting career, on the grounds that they were half-brothers; this was understood to mean that their father was Verence I but believed by Granny Weatherwax and Nanny Ogg to mean the former fool. Verence II rules the kingdom seriously (having learned that being a fool was no laughing matter). Whilst his well-meaning but often unsuccessful reforms are appreciated by his subjects, they would prefer a king who orders them around and carouses a lot because they would know their place under such rule. He is married to Magrat Garlick and has a daughter, Princess Esmeralda Margaret Note Spelling of Lancre, and two other children.

Kingdom of Liberl
The Kingdom of Liberl is part of the fictional continent of Zemuria in the video game, The Legend of Heroes: Trails in the Sky.

King Edgar von Auslese III was the 25th monarch of the Kingdom of Liberl who is mentioned during the gaming events.
Queen Alicia von Auslese II becomes the 26th monarch of the Kingdom of Liberl after her father's death. She is the grandmother of Crown Princess Klaudia von Auslese.

Grand Duchy of Lichtenburg
Grand Duchess Zona (portrayed by Joan Bennett) is a rightful ruler of the Grand Duchy of Lichtenburg who has been escorted by Count Edmond Dantès Jr. after making her escape pursued by the ruthless General Gurko Lanen and his Hussar troop in hopes to get aid from Napoleon III of France, in the film The Son of Monte Cristo, a possible sequel to The Count of Monte Cristo.

Liechtenhaus
Prince Max (portrayed by David Warner) is the ruler of the small principality of Liechtenhaus who might have to sell his royal palace to the American developers as a casino complex if he could not get an infusion of cash quickly, although he still has a daughter, Princess Sofia, and the dowry he would get from marrying her off to unappealing, in the Italian film Pretty Princess.

Little Kingdom
The Little Kingdom is the main setting in the British animated series, Ben & Holly's Little Kingdom, ruled by the fairy family of Thistle.

King and Queen Thistle (voiced by Ian Puleston-Davies and Sara Crowe)
They are the rulers of the Little Kingdom, and the parents of Princesses Holly, Daisy and Poppy, for whom Nanny Plum the tooth fairy serves as both their general housekeeper and their daughters' nanny. King Thistle is often grumpy and hungry, and Queen Thistle can be overwhelmed by the trouble Daisy and Poppy cause with their magic, though they both can be quite the kind, gentle and loving parents.

Loathing
King Ralph XI, the ruler of Loathing in the video game Kingdom of Loathing.

Kingdom of Lucis
The Kingdom of Lucis is featured in the video game Final Fantasy XV and its adaptations in other media. It is ruled by the Caelum dynasty.

Somnus Lucis Caelum
Better known as the Founder King, he was the founder and the first king of the Kingdom of Lucis who took a martial approach to quelling a plaque of darkness, called the Starscourge, subsequently taking his older brother Ardyn Izunia's place as the chosen king but accidentally killing Ardyn's fiancée the oracle, Aera Mirus Fleuret, expunging Ardyn's existence from history. As the Lucii spirit, Somnus is commonly known as the Mystic. 
Mors Lucis Caelum
He was the 112th king of the Kingdom of Lucis who, after the empire of Niflheim deployed its robot army of the magitek infantry, consolidated the power of a magical barrier called the Wall over the kingdom's capital, Insomnia (also known as the Crown City), and his son Regis returned from his trip across the land during the Great War. He also had young Cor Leonis, who survived a battle with warrior Gilgamesh (aka the Blasemaster), serving as his own bodyguard. Later, King Mors passed away in M.E. 729.
Regis Lucis Caelum CXIII
He became the 113th king of the Kingdom of Lucis following his father's passing. As a ruling monarch, Regis safeguarded the Crystal and protected Insomnia using the Wall and the hereditary Ring of the Luci. But maintaining the Wall drained the King of his life energy, causing him to age rapidly. In the web anime series Brotherhood: Final Fantasy XV, King Regis fought off the Daemon monster that almost killed his son Prince Noctis, but the two became estranged as his health failed to meet the Wall's energy demands and Noctis came to terms with his future as Lucis's new king. In the end, Regis died fighting General Glauca of Niflheim as the Ring of the Luci was cut from his hand.
Noctis "Noct" Lucis Caelum
Formerly the crown prince and heir to the throne, he was chosen by the Crystal as the "True King" when he was a child. Upon receiving the news of his kingdom's invasion by Niflheim after his marriage to Princess Lunafreya Nox Fleuret of Tenebrae, Noctis later becomes the True King himself to save the world of Eos from the Starscourge at the cost of his life. He sacrifices himself by purging the Starscourge, destroying the spirit of Niflheim's chancellor Ardyn Izunia in the afterlife with the aid of the Lucii spirits.

Lugash
Lugash is a South Asian kingdom in The Pink Panther film series.

The Maharajah of Lugash, the previous ruler who gave the "Pink Panther" diamond to his daughter the later-to-be-exiled Princess Dala (when she was a child) as a gift, in the original Pink Panther film.
King Haroak, the new ruler of Lugash who visits Nice, France, accompanied by his daughter Princess Yasmin, but has been forced by French mercenary Hans Zarba to abdicate the throne as Hans's henchmen kidnap Yasmin, until Gendarme Jacques Gambrelli rescues her and defeats Hans, in the final film Son of the Pink Panther.

Lutha
The Balkan kingdom of Lutha is featured in the novel The Mad King by Edgar Rice Burroughs.

King Leopold was the former ruler of Lutha. He was killed by one of the henchmen of his uncle Prince Peter of Blentz.
Barney Custer becomes the new king of Lutha, with Princess Emma Von Der Tann as his queen.

Luna
Luna is a kingdom on the moon, descended from earthen colonies in The Lunar Chronicles series of novels by Marissa Meyer. The Lunar people have become distance from earthens and have gained magical abilities.

 Queen Lavana (main antagonist)
 Queen Cinder

Lyrobia
Lyrobia is an African nation in the Totally Spies! episode "Queen for a Day". It contains desert and rainforest environments, with an Arabic-inspired culture.

Queen Tassara (voiced by Dawn McMillan)
She is a rightful queen regnant of Lyrobia who plans to sign a peace treaty with King Milanalwayskumar of Kenyopia to end a 20-year war between their kingdoms. She, however, has fallen victim to a strange kidnapping attempt just when the three secret agent girls, Sam, Clover and Alex, are sent to protect her. Clover goes undercover as Queen Tassara to let herself getting kidnapped in her place. Sam, Alex and the real Tassara follow her trail, only to discover that it is actually Tassara's younger sister, Princess Makeda, who plots to prevent her from signing the peace treaty and escalate the war in order to become the queen of both Lyrobia and Kenyopia. But Tassara and the trio manage to seize Makeda and her minions and imprison them. The trio then helps Queen Tassara to sign the peace treaty with Milanalwayskumar.

M

Macedon
Macedon is part of the fictional continent of Archanea in the Fire Emblem video game series. It is named after the ancient kingdom of Macedonia.

King Iote was the founder and the first monarch of Macedon who, during the War of Liberation, was but one of many slaves of the Dolhr Empire before he and some of the other slaves escaped captivity and commenced a rebellion against Dolhr. Iote wielded his own shield in his uprising, which later became one of his kingdom's national treasures.
King Osmond was the next ruler of Macedon who came into conflict with his son Prince Michalis over the kingdom's course at the onset of the War of Shadows. He wished to ally with the Holy Kingdom of Archanea. However, Osmond has been assassinated by Michalis with a persuasion of the evil wizard Gharnef.
King Michalis, formerly the prince, becomes a tyrant of Macedon after assassinating his father as he leads his kingdom into an alliance with the Dolhr Empire during the War of Shadows. He also kidnaps his younger sister Princess Maria in order to force his middle sister Princess Minerva and her order of knights, the Whitewings, to obey him. But after the battle with the Archanean League, Michalis is deposed by Prince Marth of Altea with the aid of Minerva.

Madripoor
Madripoor is the Southeast Asian principality in the Marvel Universe.

Prince Baran was the previous ruler of Madripoor who has been murdered by General Coy.
Madame Hydra becomes a deposed ruler of Madripoor as HYDRA, the terrorist organization, takes over the entire nation.

Mahishmati Kingdom
Mahishmati Kingdom is a major setting in the Baahubali franchise.

King Somadeva was the reigning Maharaja of Mahishmati Kingdom and the father of Bijjaladeva and Vikramadeva.
Bijjaladeva, the former prince of Mahishmati Kingdom, was meant to be the heir to the throne but has been replaced by his brother Vikramadeva whom he hated the most after having bad habits, like drinking. He even became more jealous of his nephew Amarendra who has been claimed to be the new king.
King Vikramadeva had been the ruler of Mahishmati Kingdom after replacing his older brother Bijjaladeva due to his bad habits.
Rajamatha Sivagami Devi, Bijjaladeva's wife, became a regent of Mahishmati Kingdom as she assumed the guardian role of the throne, raising both her nephew Amarendra and her son Bhallaladeva to be worthy heirs until it was decided that one of them would be the new King.
Amarendra Baahubali, son of Vikramadeva, has been a selected King of Mahishmati Kingdom, as chosen by his aunt Sivagami, with Princess Devasena of Kuntala as his queen.
Bhallaladeva, son of Bijjaladeva and Sivagami, became the King of Mahishmati Kingdom as he relieved his cousin and foster brother Amarendra, whom he has been envious of, of his official duties. He was later killed and defeated by his nephew Mahendra.
Mahendra Baahubali, son of Amarendra and Devasena, becomes a new King of Mahishmati Kingdom after defeating his evil uncle Bhallaladeva and slaying his adoptive cousin Bhadrudu.

Malaria
Malaria is a former kingdom, and later a republic, in the animated film Igor.

King Malbert (voiced by Jay Leno)
He was the greedy and manipulative tyrant of Malaria who planned to keep his entire kingdom in complete darkness and make his people evil by creating various doomsday device, aided by some villainous scientists, as well as blackmailing the rest of the world into paying each town not to unleash these devices. He even had his hunchbacked people, who are referred to by the derogatory name "Igor", being employed as lowly minions for the scientists whose latest weapons were showcased at an annual Evil Science Fair. One Igor, however, created a sweet female monster named Eva with the help of his friends Scamper and Brain, leading Malbert and Dr. Schadenfreude to send him to an "Igor Recycling Plant". But Igor escaped from the recycling plant and Malbert was crushed to death by his weather ray, thereby leaving Malaria to be the republic with Igor as the president.

Maldonia
The King and Queen of the country of Maldonia, who cut off their son Prince Naveen from their riches and are later the parents-in-law of Tiana, in the Disney animated film The Princess and the Frog.

Malkuth Empire
The Malkuth Empire is the sovereign nation in the video game, Tales of the Abyss.

Emperor Karl Malkuth V 
He was the previous ruler of the Malkuth Empire who had four noble concubines and whose wife, the Empress, was the one with the lowest status.
Emperor Peony Upala Malkuth IX
Emperor Karl's son who becomes a new ruler of the Malkuth Empire after his siblings had died in a struggle for the throne. His empire fights with the kingdom of Kimlasca-Lanvaldear over fragments of the "Score" prophecy, in hopes for the discovery of the future.

Margoth
Margoth is featured in the novel The Rider by Edgar Rice Burroughs.

King Alexis, the ruler whose kingdom of Margoth has been a rival to the neighboring kingdom of Karlova for centuries until they negotiate a marriage alliance between his daughter Princess Mary and Crown Prince Boris of Karlova. However, Mary intends to get out of Alexis's proposal marriage in cahoots with her nurse Carlotta.

Marl Kingdom
Marl Kingdom is a titular country in the video game series of the same name.

Ferdinand Marl E.
He is the former prince of Marl Kingdom who becomes the king when he turns 18 and marries heroine Cornet Espoir, succeeding his mother Queen Siegrind Marl. In Rhapsody: A Musical Adventure, Prince Ferdinand has been turned to stone accidentally by a sexy witch, Majorly, who is meant to put him to sleep until he is rescued by Cornet and her fairy puppet friend Kururu. In the following sequel, Little Princess, King Ferdinand and Queen Cornet have a tomboyish daughter, Princess Kurusale Cherie Marl Q. (or Kururu for short), which is named after Cornet's puppet friend.

Maruhage Empire
The Maruhage Empire (in English known as the Chrome Dome Empire) is the main antagonist of the Japanese anime series, Bobobo-bo Bo-bobo.

Tsuru Tsurulina III (Czar Baldy Bald III in English) 
He was a cruel and powerful old tyrant who was actually a demon cyborg appearing to be a human. As the emperor of the Maruhage Empire, he used "Red Magic Shinken" to avoid the attacks of his enemies and attack them back and the "Blue Magic Shinken" to destroy souls and minds. He wanted to destroy all of humanity to get the Hair Kingdom's source of power, the "Hair Ball", for himself. When he finally got the "Hair Ball" and took advantage of a vacuum in power, he declared his recently destroyed nation as the "Neo-Maruhage Empire". However, Bobobo-bo Bo-bobo and his allies went into battle and destroyed Tsuru Tsurulina III once and for all to retrieve the "Hair Ball".
Tsuru Tsurulina IV (Czar Baldy Bald IV in English)
Also known as Smoothie IV in the manga, he becomes the current emperor of the Maruhage Empire from a very young age. Unlike his predecessor, the young emperor does not want the "Hair Ball" to have a hair ability at all. He decides to enact the "New Emperor Playoff" where all powerful warriors of his empire were gathered together in a battle to determine the next emperor in order to regain his grip after being forced by the Hair Hunters. But his younger brother Hydrate takes over his tourney to become the emperor of the Reverse Maruhage Empire.

Principality of Meara
The Principality of Meara is one of the Eleven Kingdoms, ruled by the House of Quinnell, in the series of Deryni novels by Katherine Kurtz.

The reigns of the ruling princes lasted from 651 to 1055.
Prince Mear mac Quinnell, the 1st ruler of Meara, reigned 651 to 688.
Prince Archambald, the 2nd ruler of Meara, reigned 688 to 716.
Prince Jolyon I, the 3rd ruler of Meara, reigned 716 to 731.
Prince Aldebert, the 4th ruler of Meara, reigned 731 to 755.
Prince Janus, the 5th ruler of Meara, reigned 755 to 762.
Prince Armon, the 6th ruler of Meara, reigned 762 to 806.
Prince Judhael I, the 7th ruler of Meara, reigned 806 to 822.
Prince Arturus, the 8th ruler of Meara, reigned 822 to 845.
Prince Justin, the 9th ruler of Meara, reigned 845 to 874.
Prince Alban, the 10th ruler of Meara, reigned 874 to 877.
Prince Jorianna, the 11th ruler of Meara, reigned 877 to 892.
Prince Jubal mac Adam, the 12th ruler of Meara, reigned 880 to 906.
Prince Austin, the 13th ruler of Meara, reigned 906 to 928.
Prince Jehan, the 14th ruler of Meara, reigned 928 to 948.
Prince Jordon mac Jonatan, the 15th ruler of Meara, reigned 948 to 965.
Prince Ithel mac Judah mac Austin, the 16th ruler of Meara, reigned 965 to 972.
Prince Joël, the 17th ruler of Meara, reigned 972 to 976.
Prince Judhael II, the 18th ruler of Meara, reigned 976 to 1001.
Prince Jolyon II, the 19th ruler of Meara, reigned 1001 to 1025.
Prince Roisian, the last ruler of Meara whose daughter Princess Annalind married King Malcolm of Gwynedd in 1025.

Afterwards, the Mearan pretenders of the House of Quinnell were attempting to secure independence for their nation, but a series of military expeditions by King Malcolm and his descendants had succeeded in maintaining Gwynnedan reign in Meara.
Princess Annalind, the daughter and heiress of the last reigning prince.
Prince Judhael III, a pretender from 1045 to 1109.
Prince Caitrin, the last Quinnell pretender who was defeated by King Kelson of Gwynedd in 1124.
There were also the pretenders of the House of Ramsay of Cloome.
Prince Dafydd, the pretender from 1124 to 1126.
Prince Jolyon III, the last scion of Meara who renounced the claim to the throne in 1128.

Kingdom of Melromarc
The Kingdom of Melromarc is a main setting in the Japanese anime series, The Rising of the Shield Hero.

Mirellia Q. Melromarc
She was the queen regnant of the Kingdom of Melromarc who held the true power behind the throne. She returned from a diplomatic tour of the world to help the Legendary Heroes defeat her kingdom's religion, the Church of the Three Heroes. Furious at her king consort Aultcray Melromarc XXXII and eldest daughter Malty S. Melromarc for their crimes, Mirellia disowned them and revoked their nobility as punishment. Outlawing the Church of the Three Heroes, she wished to make things right with Naofumi Iwatani and did her best to support him. She also specialized in ice magic and employed several ninja-like bodyguards called "Shadows" to keep watch on each of the Heroes. While investigating the aftermath of the Guardian Beast Phoenix battle, Queen Mirellia was killed in an ambush arranged by Malty.
Melty Q. Melromarc
Formerly the second princess, she becomes the new queen of the Kingdom of Melromarc after her mother Mirellia was assassinated. Unlike her older sister Malty who is a malevolent psychopath and pathological liar, she is kind and good-natured. And when Malty becomes disowned from the royal family after Mirellia exposes her crime with the Church of the Three Heroes, Melty has been placed to be the heir to the throne. Like her mother, she is also a skilled diplomat, having traveled the world with her, as well as specializing in water magic.

Merania and Angosia
Merania and Angosia are the separated kingdoms in the Hallmark Channel television film, Royal Hearts.

King Viktor was the previous ruler of Ambrosia who had two sons whom he could not decide which one would be the new king. So he made his kingdom split into two, known as Merania and Angosia.
Hank Pavlik (portrayed by James Brolin) is the heir to the throne of Merania who has to become a new monarch after his father's death. Otherwise Merania and Angosia would reunite into one kingdom.
King Nikolas (portrayed by Lachlan Nieboer) is the ruler of Angosia who has ambitious plans to be an industrialized power and attempts to win a heart of Hank's daughter, Princess Kelly Pavlik, who is already in love with the royal stable boy named Alex.

Meribella
King Frederick (voiced by Christopher Gaze) is the ruler of Meribella and the father of Princesses Victoria (Tori), Meredith and Trevi in the animated film, Barbie: The Princess & the Popstar.

Meridian
Meridian is featured in the animated television series W.I.T.C.H.

Queen Weira and King Zayden were the previous rulers of Meridian who can only be seen in flashbacks. They were the parents of Prince Phobos and Princess Elyon.
Prince Phobos seeks to remain a ruler of Meridian, in spite of his sister Elyon being its rightful heiress, by defeating her and the Guardians of the Veil. He and his general, Lord Cedric, are the heartless tyrants who lust after Elyon's powers.
Elyon Escanor (aka Elyon Brown), the lost Princess of Meridian, is the rightful heir to the throne who has been raised as a normal girl by Alborn and Miriadel to be protected from her evil brother Phobos. She then assumes her rightful place as the Heart of Meridian, and later Queen of Meridian, after defeating Phobos and Lord Cedric alongside the titular team of W.I.T.C.H.

Meropis
Meropis is featured in the Archie Comics series, Sonic the Hedgehog.

Queen Angelica and King Puff 
The rulers of the underwater city of Meropis who thought that Coral the Betta, a young priestess, was the one who caused the Shattered World Crisis but later saw her as the rightful priestess after defeating the Dark Gaia minions. Queen Angelica is more of a serious monarch and possesses a solemn dignity to match her position, while King Puff is rather less-dignified, short-tempered and immature and tends to inflate himself on instinct whenever he gets angry. However, both Angelica and Puff are not open-minded, seeing the explanation of Sonic the Hedgehog for the misfortunes afflicting their city as "stupid" or "ridiculous". Angelica and Puff are the parents of Princess Undina who is a childhood friend to Coral.

Merryland
Queen Dolly, the living wax doll who is a ruler of Merryland and resides in the Valley of Dolls where she adopts Dot Freeland and Tot Thompson, in the Oz novel series by L. Frank Baum.

Mewni
Mewni is featured in the Disney XD animated series Star vs. the Forces of Evil. It is ruled by the queen regnants, members of the Butterfly dynasty.

Queen Soupina Butterfly (aka Soupina the Strange)
Queen Lyric Butterfly
Queen Skywynne Butterfly (aka Skywynne, Queen of Hours)
She once wielded the Royal Magic Wand, taking the form of a clock in her possession.
Queen Solaria Butterfly (aka Solaria the Monster Carver)
The second-born child of Queen Skywynne, she was the general of the Solarian Army whose goal was to eradicate all monsters.
Queen Eclipsa Butterfly (aka Eclipsa, the Queen of Darkness)
She once ruled Mewni during her time alongside her ex-husband King Shastacan, the prince of the Spiderbite Kingdom, until she left her kingdom, believing it to be for the best. Eclipsa travels to the present to help her descendant Queen Moon solve a mystery involving the true identity of her baby daughter Princess Meteora Butterfly whose alter ego was Miss Heinous, the headmistress of St. Olga's Reform School for Wayward Princesses. After reverting her daughter back to her true self, she becomes the current queen of Mewni as she regains her status until she returns the Royal Magic Wand to Moon. 
Queen Festivia Butterfly (aka Festivia the Fun)
She was originally a peasant who was raised by the Magic High Commission to be the queen of Mewni and loved to throw parties.
Queen Crescenta Butterfly (aka Crescenta the Eager)
The second-born daughter of Queen Festivia who inherited the Royal Magic Wand, superseding her older sister Princess Dirhhennia the Heaped after she was deemed unfit to reign Mewni.
Queen Rhina Butterfly (aka Rhina the Riddled)
Queen Celena Butterfly (aka Celena the Shy)
Queen Estrella Butterfly (aka Estrella the Drafted)
Queen Comet Butterfly (aka Comet the Chef)
She was the previous queen of Mewni who has been killed by the evil Toffee during his attack on her kingdom.
Queen Moon Butterfly (aka Moon the Undaunted)
She succeeded the throne and the leadership of the Magic High Commission after her mother's tragic death when she was a teenager. While reigning Mewni alongside her husband King River Butterfly, who is a member of the Viking-like barbarian family of Johansen, with a steady, calm and thoughtful hand, Moon's experience makes her overprotective of her daughter Star at times.
Princess Star Butterfly (aka Star the Underestimated)
In Season 3, Star temporary makes the reigning queen of Mewni when her mother goes missing and she leads an army against the monstrous Princess Meteora. However, after Queen Eclipsa takes the Royal Magic Wand and reverts Meteora back into an infant child, Star decides to return the throne and the wand to Eclipsa. She leaves her kingdom behind and gives up her title as princess and later learns that she is still connected to her human friend and love interest, Marco Diaz, though she was originally a girlfriend of Crown Prince Tom Lucitor of the Underworld.

Mirkwood
Thranduil, the elven king of the woodland realm of Mirkwood and the father of Legolas in the novel The Hobbit by J. R. R. Tolkien and its film adaptations.

Island of Misfit Toys
King Moonracer (voiced by Stan Francis), the winged lion and the sovereign of the Island of Misfit Toys in the Rankin/Bass stop-motion holiday special, Rudolph the Red-Nosed Reindeer.

Mobotropolis/Robotropolis
Mobotropolis is featured in the animated television series, Sonic Underground.

Queen Aleena Hedgehog (voiced by Gail Webster), the former ruler of Mobotropolis and the mother of Sonic, Sonia and Manic Hedgehog. She has been overthrown by the evil Dr. Robotnik who can seize control of her country, renaming it to "Robotropolis" under his command. Aleena has to separate her triplets to preserve the dynasty after being told by the Oracle of Delphius of a prophecy.

Moldavia
Moldavia is featured in the television series Dynasty.

King Galen (portrayed by Joel Fabiani)
He is the monarch of Moldavia who has been a friend to Alexis Colby for quite some time. At the end of Season 5, Alexis encourages the relationship by planning to wed her daughter Amanda to Galen's son Prince Michael, making her a Moldavian princess, although Michael himself was originally a lover to Duchess Elena of Moldavia. However, the wedding ceremony is interrupted by a political coup in attempt to kill King Galen. As Michael and the others eventually leave Moldavia, they are told that the King is killed during the attack. However at Season 6, Alexis learns that Galen is actually being held for ransom, so she and her lover Dex Dexter have to come and rescue him. Alexis then uncovers the schemes of the King who has been paralyzed and plans to reclaim his crown, offering to make her his queen to break Dex's heart.

Montenaro
Montenaro is a country ruled by the Delacourt family in The Princess Switch film trilogy on Netflix.

Lady Margaret Katherine Claire Delacourt (portrayed by Vanessa Hudgens)
In the first film to the series, Margaret Delacourt formerly serves as the duchess of Montenaro for she has been arranged to marry Crown Prince Edward Wyndham of Belgravia. Upon her arrival at Belgravia, however, she is drawn into a normal life without royalty as she trades places with Stacy De Novo, a young baker from Chicago who is her doppelgänger. After switching back, Margaret is sent by Edward's mother Queen Caroline to Belgravia's own baking contest where she and Edward present the award medal for Stacy and her friend Kevin Richards who have won this competition. In the sequel, Switched Again, Margaret's cousin Lady Fiona Pembroke tries to take over Montenaro disguising herself as Margaret. But Fiona has been exposed and arrested by Stacy as Margaret herself is rightfully crowned queen of Montenaro with Kevin becoming her consort. And in Romancing the Star, Queen Margaret teams up with Stacy and Fiona to track down Hunter Cunard, a wealthy master thief who has stolen the priceless Christmas relic called the "Star of Peace". Margaret and Stacy are similar to Prince Edward Tudor and Tom Canty from Mark Twain's novel The Prince and the Pauper.

Mushroom Kingdom
Princess Peach Toadstool is the rightful young regnant of the Mushroom Kingdom in the Mario video game franchise. She is usually a damsel in distress who gets captured by the evil king of the Koopas, Bowser (aided by his son and heir Bowser Jr. and seven minions the Koopalings), but gets rescued by the two brothers, Mario and Luigi (see Princess and dragon).

N

Naboo
Naboo is featured in the Star Wars franchise.

Padmé Amidala, Elected Queen of Naboo in the film Star Wars: Episode I – The Phantom Menace.
Queen Jamillia, Elected Queen of Naboo in the film Star Wars: Episode II – Attack of the Clones.
Queen Neeyutnee, Elected Queen of Naboo in Star Wars: The Clone Wars.
Queen Apailana, Elected Queen of Naboo in the film Star Wars: Episode III – Revenge of the Sith.

Isle of Naboombu
King Leonidas, an anthropomorphic lion who is the greedy ruler of the Isle of Naboombu and hates humans in the Disney animated/live-action film Bedknobs and Broomsticks and its stage musical adaptation.

Narnia
Narnia is the main setting in The Chronicles of Narnia series of novels by C. S. Lewis, and its adaptations in other media.

Aslan, the Great Lion
Jadis, the usurper Witch Queen
The kings and queens of old:
Peter Pevensie, known as "High King Peter the Magnificent"
Susan Pevensie, known as "Queen Susan the Gentle"
Edmund Pevensie, known as "King Edmund the Just"
Lucy Pevensie, known as "Queen Lucy the Valiant"
Miraz
Caspian X
Rilian
Tirian

Nayapuram
Nayapuram is a neighboring kingdom to Jalpur in the Disney Junior animated series, Mira, Royal Detective.

The King and Queen of Nayapuram (voiced by Husein Madhavji and Tiya Sircar)
They are the rulers of Nayapuram who along with their daughter and heir Princess Shivani travel all across other kingdoms in disguise to learn more about their people, including detective Mira and her allies in Jalpur.

Neptune City
Queen Coralie (voiced by Leigh-Allyn Baker) is the mermaid queen of the underwater kingdom of Neptune City in the Disney Junior animated series, Jake and the Never Land Pirates.

Neighborhood of Make-Believe
The Neighborhood of Make-Believe is the kingdom inhabited by the hand puppet characters in the children's television series Mister Rogers' Neighborhood.

King Friday XIII is the imperious ruler of the Neighborhood of Make-Believe, the husband of Queen Sara Saturday, and the father of Prince Tuesday.

Niflheim
Emperor Iedolas Aldercapt, the evil ruler of Niflheim who seeks to conquer the world by toppling the Kingdom of Lucis, in the video game Final Fantasy XV and its adaptations in other media.

Night Court
The Night Court is featured in the novel series A Court of Thorns and Roses by Sarah J. Maas. It is one of the seven courts of prythian, fully autonomous and ruled by a High Lord, who is chosen by the magic. It is usually a son of the previous High Lord, but it can be any male relative as only males can inherit.

High Lord Rhysand of the Night Court
High Lady Feyre of the Night Court
In the second book of the series, Feyre is declared High Lady, the first ever and a co-ruler to Rhysand.

Nihon-Ja
Nihon-Ja is the fictional Japanese empire in the Ranger's Apprentice novel, The Emperor of Nihon-Ja, by John Flanagan.

Emperor Shigeru Motodato
He is the sovereign of Nihon-Ja who is very popular with his people, known for his great courage and as a fair emperor. He and his cousin Shukin seek refuge at the mountains against the rebellion led by the ambitious Lord Arisaka and his army of an arrogant Senshi class who are tricked into believing that Shigeru was trying to usurp their authority. Shigeru then makes a friend with knight Horace Altman after assisting in stopping the rebellion, later making him his new Senshi swordsman after Shukin is killed by Arisaka in a duel while covering his retreat.

Nohr
Nohr is the fictional European kingdom in the video game, Fire Emblem Fates.

King Garon is the brutal, villainous ruler of Nohr who decides to fight for Hoshido, killing its King Sumeragi and abducting his child Corrin. Following the death of Queen Katerina, Garon is remarried to the late Queen Arete of Valla with whom he has a stepdaughter, Princess Azura. He is the father of Princes Xander and Leo and Princesses Camilla and Elise.
Xander, the former crown prince and paladin, becomes the new King of Nohr to reign justly as he lays the foundation for a new era of peace and prosperity for his kingdom (ending varies). Xander has the son and heir, Siegbert the cavalier, who grew up in a secluded realm.

Kingdom of Noland
King Bud, whose real name is Timothy, is a young, orphaned boy who becomes a monarch of the Kingdom of Noland with his sister Fluff (real name Meg) as its princess, in the novel Queen Zixi of Ix by L. Frank Baum and its film adaptation, The Magic Cloak of Oz.

Nome Kingdom
The Nome Kingdom is featured in the Oz novel series by L. Frank Baum, and its film adaptation Return to Oz. Its ruler is known as the "Nome King".

Ruggedo of the Rocks (also referred to as Roquat the Red) is the villainous, stubborn Nome King who has been overthrown and loses his throne of the Nome Kingdom but still thinks of himself as a king.
Kaliko, the former chamberlain, becomes the second Nome King after dethroning Ruggedo. He promises to be a good king during his reign, unlike Ruggedo.

Kingdom of Nova
The Kingdom of Nova is featured in the video game, Long Live the Queen.

Queen Fidelia was the late monarch of the Kingdom of Nova.
Princess Elodie has to be trained to become the new monarch of the Kingdom of Nova after her mother's death but has been killed.

O

Oceana
Oceana is an underwater kingdom, inhabited by merfolk, in the animated film Barbie in A Mermaid Tale and its sequel Barbie in A Mermaid Tale 2.

Queen Calissa (voiced by Nicole Oliver)
She is a rightful ruler of Oceana who makes Merillia, the life force of the ocean, and has been overthrown and locked in by her evil sister Eris. Calissa is married to a human named Rip Summers with whom she has a daughter, Merliah Summers, who is half human and half mermaid. Because Merliah was born with human legs and not a mermaid tail, Calissa knew that it would be dangerous for her to live in Oceana looking like a human. So she gave up her daughter to Rip's father, Break Summers, who would take good care of her after Rip's death. Many years later, after Merliah (who now has her own tail) saves Oceana and sets Calissa free from her prison, she makes Merliah a crown princess and becomes a reigning queen again.
Queen Eris (voiced by Kathleen Barr)
Calissa's wicked and selfish sister who deposes and imprisons her to become a queen of Oceana. She rules unfairly and makes the ocean become sick and grow weaker since she cannot make Merillia properly. However, Eris has been deposed and sent into the deepest depths of the ocean by her niece Merliah. In the following sequel, Eris escapes from her prison with the help of Kylie Morgan, an Australian surfer who competes with Merliah, and reveals that she has the power to make anyone live through their worst nightmare. And with it, she plans to take over Oceana and spin Merillia once again. But in the end, Crown Princess Merliah ultimately defeats Queen Eris, leading her to experience her own worst nightmare; she is now stuck being a human and loses all of her magic powers.

Oogaboo
Oogaboo is a small, poor kingdom in the Winkie Country, in the Oz novel series by L. Frank Baum.

King Jol Jemkiph Soforth, the former monarch of Oogaboo whose wife the Queen was sharp-tongued and small-respected for him. He left his kingdom and escaped the Queen into the Land of Oz. Jol was the father of Queen Ann and Princess Salye Soforth.
Queen Ann Soforth becomes a new monarch of Oogaboo following her father's abdication. She sets out to raise an army to conquer Oz but later join the Shaggy Man, Tik-Tok, Betsy Bobbin and Hank the Mule to set out for the Nome Kingdom where they rescue the Shaggy Man's brother.

Opar
Opar is the surviving colony of Atlantis, located deep in the African jungles in the Tarzan novel series by Edgar Rice Burroughs.

Queen La of Opar 
She is a high priestess and the ruler of the lost city of Opar. La is a beautiful witch whose Oparian men are, consequently, rather hideous bestial creatures. So much so, she only chooses Tarzan to be her own lover, because of his perfect and attractive physical appearance. But Tarzan is already in the relationship with Jane Porter as he escapes from La and manages to rejoin the Waziri tribe. After the Oparian men take Jane as a substitute victim, Tarzan returns to Opar and saves her from being sacrificed by the jealous Queen La. And La is crushed by Tarzan's spurning of her for Jane. However, in Tarzan and the Jewels of Opar, she is reencountered by Tarzan, who again rejects her and escapes along with her sacred dagger. She later finds herself unable to kill Tarzan after the Oparians recaptured him. She is also branded a traitor by Opar's high priest, Cadj, but Tarzan saves her and then persuades the other priests to reject Cadj and return La to her city.

Kingdom of Oriana
The Kingdom of Oriana is featured in the animated film, Felix the Cat: The Movie.

Princess Oriana (voiced by Maureen O'Connell) is the rightful ruler of the Kingdom of Oriana who has been taken captive by the army of robots until she is rescued by Felix the Cat (see Princess and dragon).
The Duke of Zill (voiced by Peter Newman), the evil uncle of Princess Oriana, attempts to take over the Kingdom of Oriana with his robotic army.

Outworld
Outworld is an imperial realm featured in the Mortal Kombat video game franchise.

Onaga the Dragon King was the Emperor of Outworld millions of years ago before being overthrown by Shao Kahn.
Shao Kahn was Emperor after overthrowing Onaga. He would conquer many other realms and attempt to conquer Earthrealm several times as well, though unsuccessfully.
Kotal Kahn was son of Kotal K'etz, ruler of the realm of Osh-Tekk which was conquered by Shao Kahn. Kotal Kahn became Emperor after Shao Kahn's death, though Mileena, a clone of Shao Kahn's stepdaughter Kitana, claimed that the throne was rightfully hers and led a rebellion against Kotal Kahn.
Mileena Kahn (disputed) was a clone of Shao Kahn's stepdaughter Kitana mixed with Tarkatan DNA. She claimed herself to be the real Empress of Outworld after her father's death, rebelling against Kotal Kahn. Her rebellion would fail however as she would be captured and killed by Kotal Kahn's advisor D'Vorah.
Kitana Kahn is a princess of the realm of Edenia, and the daughter of Queen Sindel, who would be appointed as the Empress of Outworld after Kotal Kahn was severely injured by her stepfather Shao Kahn.

Land of Oz
The Land of Oz is a main setting in the Oz novel series by L. Frank Baum, and its adaptations in other media.

King Pastoria 
He is the former ruler of the Land of Oz who reigned alongside his wife Queen Lurline, goddess of the fairies, but has been removed mysteriously from his position when the Wizard unexpectedly came to Oz and took over the throne as its new dominant ruler. It is later revealed that the wicked witch Mombi had enchanted Pastoria in the form of Tora the Tired Tailor with amnesia at the town of Morrow in the Quadling Country. He then returns to the Emerald City and forces Mombi disenchant him, executing her by water before stepping down as a king and opening a tailor shop called "The Tired Tailor of Oz" under his own name.
Princess Ozma 
She becomes the new and rightful ruler of the Land of Oz after Glinda the Good Witch allows her to ascend the throne, following the abdication of her father Pastoria. Ozma was given from Pastoria to Mombi who placed a curse on her, turning her into a boy called Tippetarius (or Tip for short), to prevent her from ascending her throne until Glinda later changed her back and Ozma herself is established back in her place as the young official Queen of Oz. She is also the creator of Jack Pumpkinhead.

P

Paladia
Paladia is a kingdom mentioned in the animated film, Barbie as the Island Princess.

Queen Marissa (voiced by Kate Fisher)
She is a queen dowager whose husband the King of Paladia had died during a storm while on a ship in the South Seas. Her long-lost daughter Princess Rosella has been washed up on a deserted tropical island where she is adopted by the animals with her shorter name "Ro" due to her amnesia. Ten years later, while attending the wedding ceremony at the neighboring kingdom of Apollonia, Marissa reunites with Rosella as they sing a lullaby from Rosella's childhood together.

Papilloma
King Javier (portrayed by Rob Sitch), the last monarch whose tiny and poor Spanish kingdom of Papilloma would later become a republic, in the Kath & Kim spin-off film Kath & Kimderella. Although he actually has no children, Javier is the adoptive father of Prince Julio, whom Kim Craig becomes engaged to.

Paradiso
Paradiso is featured in the manga series, Kilala Princess.

Prince Rei is the rightful ruler whose kingdom of Paradiso has been taken over by his villainous bodyguard and servant Valdou and the Coup, whom his memories were erased by. In search for the princess of his own country, he travels to an ordinary town where he is found by a girl named Kilala Reno as he goes asleep. Rei then makes Kilala a princess herself under his marriage in order to save their kingdom together from Valdou.

Pixie Hollow
Queen Clarion (voiced by Anjelica Huston) is the reigning fairy queen of the magical kingdom of Pixie Hollow in the secret heart of Neverland, who acts motherly to all of the fairies, including Tinker Bell, and is able to travel in the form of the golden pixie dust, in Disney's Tinker Bell film series.

Pride Lands
Leading the African savannah of Pride Lands is the reigning family of lions from Disney's The Lion King franchise, which is influenced by the works of William Shakespeare.

Mohatu
He was the previous King of the Pride Lands during the events of The Lion King: Six New Adventures story, The Brightest Star.
Ahadi
The son of Mohatu and the father of Mufasa and Scar; the other previous King of Pride Lands during the events of the story A Tale of Two Brothers.
Mufasa
He was the King of the Pride Lands, with his mate Sarabi as its Queen, in the first animated film The Lion King whereupon he was killed by his wicked, sinister brother Scar with a stampede of wildebeest but has eventually become the heavenly spirit. Mufasa is inspired by the character of King Hamlet (Hamlet).
Scar
He was formerly the new King of the Pride Lands of which he mistreated both the entire savanna and his subjects with a group of hyenas by his side until he was dethroned by his nephew Simba. Scar is inspired by the character of King Claudius (Hamlet).
Simba
He becomes the rightful King of the Pride Lands after the death of his father Mufasa and the defeat of his evil uncle Scar as he and his mate the newly crowned Queen Nala bring back peace and good nature to their subjects. Simba is inspired by the title character from Hamlet and Lord Capulet from Romeo and Juliet. 
Kiara
The firstborn cub of Simba and Nala. She is the lioness who has been set to become the new Queen of the Pride Lands, with Kovu as her prince consort, in the film sequel The Lion King II: Simba's Pride. Kiara is inspired by the character of Juliet Capulet (Romeo and Juliet).
Kion
The second-born cub of Simba and Nala and Kiara's younger brother. He is the former leader of the Lion Guard and later crowned King of the Tree of Life with Rani as his Queen, in the Disney Junior animated series The Lion Guard.

Prydain
Prydain is an eponymous Welsh kingdom in The Chronicles of Prydain novel series by Lloyd Alexander. Its ruler is known as the "High King".

Achren was the evil sorceress who formerly ruled Prydain as its queen, until her tyranny was ended by her consort and former student Death-Lord Arawn.
Math was the High King of Prydain during most of The Chronicles of Prydain novels.
Gwydion, formerly a prince, briefly becomes High King of Prydain after Math's death in the final novel The High King.
Taran becomes High King of Prydain at the end of the novel The High King, with Princess Eilonwy of Llyr as his queen.

R

Radaxian
Radaxian is a main setting of the Alex Kidd video game series.

King Thunder (also known as King Sander or King Thor)
In the first game Alex Kidd in Miracle World, Thunder was defeated when his kingdom has been invaded by the evil alien emperor, Janken the Great, who turned many of his subjects into stones. Although it was initially thought that King Thunder and his wife Queen Patricia have been captured by Janken, their son and heir Prince Egle has actually been held captive by him inside of his castle, along with Egle's fiancée Princess Lora. In The Enchanted Castle, it is revealed that Thunder is still alive and now located on the planet Paperock. His long-lost son Alex Kidd travels to the planet to rescue him, but later discovers that the King is there of his own accord with Janken's son Ashra as his servant.
King Egle (also known as King Igul)
Formerly the prince, he becomes the new king of Radaxian, in which he originally rules as its regent, after his brother Alex Kidd defeated Janken the Great and rescued him and his fiancée Princess Lora. Egle had assumed leadership of his kingdom following his father's disappearance not too long before Janken captured and imprisoned him. Later, in spite of Egle's warning to Alex not to go to the dangerous planet Paperock, he has been told that his father Thunder is resided on that planet. And thereafter, his kingdom makes peace with Planet Paperock. King Egle also appears alongside his wife Lora and his mother Queen Patricia in Alex Kidd BMX Trial.

Rain Dukedom
The Rain Dukedom is featured in the Japanese anime series The World Is Still Beautiful.

Tohara has been a previous sovereign of the Rain Dukedom, the true mastermind, and the rain-summoning teacher.
Teteru Lemercier, Tohara's son-in-law, is the reigning duke of the Rain Dukedom and the father of Princesses Mira, Nia, Kara and Nike Lemercier.

Rainbow Kingdom
The Rainbow Kingdom is the primary setting in the Netflix animated series True and the Rainbow Kingdom.

The Rainbow King is the humble and sympathetic ruler of the Rainbow Kingdom who, though possessing a wealth of knowledge, shares his wisdom in riddles adding fun to True's adventures complexity.
The Day Queen is the official queen whose purpose is to bring daylight to the Rainbow Kingdom when it becomes daytime.
The Night Queen, Day Queen's sister, is the other official queen who is responsible for bringing moonlight to the Rainbow Kingdom when it is nighttime.

Ravka
Ravka is the setting in the novel Shadow and Bone by Leigh Bardugo and the Netflix adaptation of the same name. It is based on early 19th century Czarist Russia.

King Nikolai Lanstov of Ravka (abdicated)
Zoya Nazyalensky, the dragon queen of Ravka

Razkavia
The Germanic kingdom of Razkavia is featured in the novel The Tin Princess by Sir Philip Pullman.

Prince Rudolf briefly becomes the new King of Razkavia following his father's death but has been murdered during the coronation.
Adelaide Bevan, who had recently become a crown princess, becomes the reigning queen of Razkavia after her husband Rudolf got killed.

Re-Estize Kingdom
The Re-Estize Kingdom is featured in the Japanese light novel series, Overlord. It is ruled by the Vaiself family.

Ramposa Ryle Vaiself III
He was the previous king of the Re-Estize Kingdom who struggled to keep his country united amidst political infighting and invasions by other nations, such as the Baharuth Empire and the Sorcerer Kingdom, as well as struggling to balance his duties as both a reigning king and a father to Princes Barbro and Zanac and Princess Renner. However, Ramposa was ultimately unable to save his country against the Sorcerer Kingdom.
Zanac Valleon Igana Ryle Vaiself
The second son of King Ramposa, he desires to ascend the throne, sparking a rivalry with his older brother Crown Prince Barbro, though he genuinely cares for his kingdom and its people. Soon after Barbro's death, Zanac becomes the crown prince himself and the king regent of the Re-Estize Kingdom after the launch of a coup. He leads his kingdom in a futile war against the Sorcerer Kingdom but has ultimately been slain by traitorous nobles. In high regard for the steady recovery, Sorcerer King Ainz Ooal Gown heels Prince Zanac and holds the utmost respect from him. But his death greatly angers Ainz and gives the nobles their "just rewards" by having intelligence investigator Neuronist Painkill slowly torture them and their families until they die.

Renais
Renais is part of the fictional continent of Magvel in the video game, Fire Emblem: The Sacred Stones.

King Fado was a warrior king and the general of Renais who ordered his army to lay down their arms and urged his daughter Princess Erika to escape with knights Seth and Franz as he stayed at his castle when his kingdom was invaded by the Grado Empire led by its "Silent Emperor" Vigarde. While finding out why Grado had invaded, Fado was killed by the empire's forces.
Prince Ephraim, the kind-hearted lord, becomes the new ruler of Renais after his father's tragic death in invasion and after recovering five Sacred Stones with his twin sister Erika and Emperor Vigarde's son Prince Lyon and defeating the Demon King Fomortiis.

Rigel
Rigel is an empire in the fictional continent of Valentia in the video game, Fire Emblem Gaiden, and its remake, Echoes: Shadows of Valentia.

Emperor Rudolf, the Gold Knight and the previous ruler of the Rigelian Empire who posed as a malevolent tyrant and invaded the neighboring kingdom of Zofia as part of his plan to instigate the rise of the true heroes in Valentia to combat the corrupting influence of the two gods, Mila the Earth Mother and her brother Duma the War Father. He was the uncle of Berkut and the biological father of Prince Alm.
Albein Alm Rudolf, formerly the crown prince and rightful heir, ascends the throne after his father Rudolf was killed in battle, uniting his empire of Rigel with Zofia into the One Kingdom of Valentia as its founding king, with his wife and former foster sister Princess Celica of Zofia becoming a queen. In Shadows of Valentia, Alm's cousin Berkut has been a possible heir apparent to the imperial throne.

Robo-Hungarian Empire
Emperor Nikolai
In the Futurama episode "The Prisoner of Benda", Bender attempts to steal Emperor Nikolai's crown with the aid of a consciousness switching machine built by Professor Farnsworth and Amy in order to avoid being identified. After the robbery goes wrong and he convinces Nikolai that he is a robot in a human's body, Bender manages to switch consciousness with him (in a robot wash bucket's body), planning to live like an emperor whilst Nikolai can live a free 'peasant' robot's life. However, this goes wrong when both Nikolai's wife and head of security plan to murder the Emperor and blame the burglar.

Rohan
Théoden, King of Rohan in the novel The Lord of the Rings by J. R. R. Tolkien.
Éomer, maternal nephew of Théoden, becomes King of Rohan after his uncle's demise in the Pelennor Fields.

Rubovia
King Rufus XIV is the ruler of the Kingdom of Rubovia, father of Prince Rupert and husband of Queen Caroline, in the British children's series A Rubovian Legend.

Ruritania
King Rudolf V, the heir of Ruritania, has been drugged by his half-brother Duke Michael of Strelsau on the eve of his coronation and has been imprisoned in the castle of Zenda in the novel The Prisoner of Zenda by Anthony Hope.
Queen Flavia, formerly the princess, becomes a monarch of Ruritania alone after King Rudolf was buried in the novel sequel Rupert of Hentzau.

Ruzhien Empire
The Ruzhien Empire is the main antagonist of the Valkyria Chronicles video game spin-off, Valkyria Revolution. It is essentially analogous to the Russian Empire.

Klaudiusz Powlovich Kiev (voiced by Darin De Paul)
He is a powerful emperor of the Ruzhien Empire who is claimed to be a national hero for transforming a small country into the largest nation in all of the continent of Europa. Assisted by the Grand Generals and Valkyria Brunhilde, Emperor Klaudiusz maintains an iron grip on his empire but also shows his willingness to be pragmatic when it benefits him, including the induction of Prince Maxim Laertes of Ipseria into his inner circle.

Ryugu Kingdom
The Ryugu Kingdom is a country located on Fishman Island in the Japanese anime series, One Piece. It is inhabited by the fish-men and the merfolk.

King Neptune
He is a giant coelacanth-type merman who rules the Ryugu Kingdom and whose captain of the New Fishman Pirates, Hordy Jones, has assassinated his wife the mermaid queen Otohime, leaving him in rage mistakenly towards the humans. He intends to capture Monkey D. Luffy and his Straw Hat Pirate crew in response to this crime. However, Neptune and the Straw Hat Pirates discover that Hordy is the one who gets away with it by placing the blame on the human pirates. He also orders the Straw Hat Pirates to go rescue his daughter the Mermaid Princess Shirahoshi who has been kidnapped by Vander Decken IX. His name is derived from the god of freshwater and the sea in Roman mythology.

S

Sadida Kingdom
The Sadida Kingdom is featured in the French animated television series Wakfu.

King Oakheart Sheran Sharm is a jolly ruler of the Sadida Kingdom who, despite his "king" status, is not familiar with formalities. He temporarily leaves his position to his son Armand when the Tree of Life is sick. It is later revealed that Oakheart lays gravely ill and expects to pass away soon.
Prince Armand Sheran Sharm is an arrogant young man who acts like a ruler of the Sadida Kingdom when his father is away. He later gets annoyed constantly by how his sister Amalia does not care about politics, due to the King's illness.
Princess Amalia Sheran Sharm has taken her mother's position as the Queen of the Sadida Kingdom in the Special Episodes.

Kingdom of Sahrani
The Kingdom of Sahrani is the Atlantic island nation in the video game, ARMA: Armed Assault, and its expansion pack, Queen's Gambit.

King Joseph III was the monarch of the Kingdom of South Sahrani who ordered his Royal Army Corps to mobilize due to the act of war and denounced Prime Minister Torrez of the Democratic Republic of Sahrani. He then became the king of Sahrani after the Southern kingdom and Northern republic were reunified. However, while on a tour through the country, Joseph and his son and heir Crown Prince Orlando were killed in an aviation accident as the helicopter got crashed.
Queen Isabella Ximénez, formerly a princess, becomes the new monarch of the Kingdom of Sahrani as she quickly assumes power over the country, following the sudden deaths of her father Joseph and older brother Orlando. She, however, receives reports from her trusted intelligence sources that Prince Orlando actually survives the helicopter crash. Isabella is either overthrown (killed or escapes) or manages to get her brother killed.

Salmaah
The fictional Middle Eastern sultanate of Salmaah is featured in the French-Tunisian film Black Gold.

Sultan Amar (portrayed by Mark Strong) is the ruler of Salmaah who has been defeated by Emir Nesib of Hobeika in a border war and has been forced by him to agree that the "Yellow Belt" barren strip would belong to neither, turning it into a no-man's-land between their nations. Amar is the father of Princes Saleh and Auda, whom he had forcedly to trade to Nesib who would rear them with his children, Prince Tariq and Princess Leyla.

Samavia
Samavia is a fictional Eastern European kingdom in the novel The Lost Prince by Frances Hodgson Burnett. It was originally ruled by the House of Fedorovitch during the Middle Ages.

King Fedorovitch, the original monarch of Samavia whose son Prince Ivor Fedorovitch mysteriously disappeared, leaving his kingdom into civil wars similar to the Wars of the Roses between the Houses of Iarovitch and Maranovitch over the next five centuries.
King Michael Maranovitch, the previous monarch of Samavia who was assassinated early in the 20th century, leading civil war to break out as Nicola Iarovitch sought to gain the crown.
Stefan Loristan, the patriot who plans to overthrow the cruel dictator in Samavia. His son Marco eventually discovers that Stefan is actually Samavia's rightful king, the descendant of the lost prince Ivor Fedorovitch.

Santovasku Empire
The Santovasku Empire is a technologically advanced, interstellar alien nation in the Japanese manga, Outlanders, and its original video animation adaptation.

Emperor Quevas XIII
He was the ruthless and supreme ruler of the Santovasku Empire who was informed that the imperial "sacred planet" was infested with humans of Earth while Togo, the supreme commander of the Japanese Self-Defense Force, was preparing for an impending war with the alien invaders. Resorting to mind control, Quevas sent his empire's fleet commander, Battia Bureitin Rou, to retrieve his impulsive daughter Crown Princess Kahm who went to Earth to escape her confined life. He initiated the invasion of Earth solely to eradicate Neo, the ancient sorceror of the Yoma Clan who posed a threat of his life. In a final confrontation, Tetsuya Wakatsuki invaded the imperial palace to rescue Kahm before she herself fatally wounded Quevas with a sword stab, thereby triggering the utter destruction of the Santovasku Empire.

Sarasaland
Princess Daisy is the tomboyish sovereign of Sarasaland in the Mario video game franchise. In Super Mario Land, Daisy was once taken captive by Tatanga, an evil alien who attempts to marry her and conquer her entire country, until she is rescued by Mario. However, throughout the rest of the video game series, Daisy remains a very feisty princess, unlike Princess Peach.

Seagundia
Seagundia is a magical underwater kingdom in the animated film, Barbie: The Pearl Princess.

King Nereus and Queen Lorelei (voiced by Mark Oliver and Rebecca Shoichet)
They are the rulers of Seagundia whose royal family are able to use magic over pearls. Their brother-in-law, Caligo, wants his son Fergis to be the heir to the throne. But their newborn daughter, Princess Lumina, has already been made the rightful heir, so Caligo arranges with Scylla the potion maker to kill her in exchange for payment. Scylla, however, cannot bring herself to kill the princess as she instead raises her far away as her niece. While remaining distraught about their daughter's disappearance for seventeen years, Nereus and Lorelei lock themselves in their royal castle. They agree to give their nephew Fergis the Pearl of the Sea medallion to make him the new heir, although Lorelei hopes their both medallion and kingdom would go to Lumina. Caligo also asks Scylla to poison Nereus's merberry nectar at the toast of the royal ball for Fergis. However, Lumina, who now works as a hairstylist, uses the pearl magic to protect Scylla while Nereus and Lorelei imprison Caligo and his guards the Trident Squad during their family reunion. King Nereus is named after the Greek God of the Sea.

Holy Kingdom of Seyruun
The Holy Kingdom of Seyruun is featured in the Japanese anime series, Slayers.

Philionel El Di Seyruun
He is the crown prince and heir of the Holy Kingdom of Seyruun and the father of Gracia Ul Naga and Amelia Wil Telsa Seyruun. His father Eldoran Seyruun, who is technically the current king, is old, sickly and bedridden, so he more or less runs the kingdom for him. Due to the death of his wife who was killed by the assassin and the absence of his elder daughter Princess Gracia who now calls herself "Naga the White Serpent", Phil is very close with and protective of his younger daughter Princess Amelia.

Shimmervale
Shimmervale is a crystal fairy kingdom in Fairytopia, powered by the untouchable crystallites, in the animated film sequel, Barbie: Mariposa & the Fairy Princess.

King Regellius (voiced by Russell Roberts)
He is a widowed fairy king of Shimmervale who is very skeptical towards Mariposa because his kingdom believes something untrue about the butterfly fairies like herself in Flutterfield. But his daughter Princess Catania quickly befriends Mariposa as they eventually have to defeat the evil fairy, Gwyllion, who has turned the crystallites into rocks, causing Shimmervale to freeze. In the end, Regellius apologizes to Mariposa for misjudging her and makes peace with the butterfly fairies by attending the ball where he dances with Queen Marabella of Flutterfield.

Silverland
Silverland is a major setting in the Japanese anime series, Princess Knight.

The King and Queen of Silverland
The current rulers of Silverland whose villainous nobleman, Duke Duralumin, would repress the people if his son Plastic is to become a king and he himself to be his regent. The law has stated that only a young prince can prevent the evil duke from inheriting the throne, but the King and Queen just happen to have a daughter anyway. Thus, the King has to announce that this child, Sapphire, is a boy instead of a girl, preventing Duralumin from finding out the truth. However, Duralumin and his henchman Baron Nylon attempt to prove that Prince Sapphire is really a girl as they often scheme to take over Silverland. Soon after Duke Duralumin stages a coup d'état to conquer Silverland, following the orders of the evil Mr. X of the X-Union, the King and Queen have been executed by being dropped in the sea but are later resurrected when the young angel Tink (or Choppy in English dub) sacrifices his mortal life.
Princess Sapphire (Princess Knight in English)
The princess and heir of Silverland who has been assigned female at birth but is raised as the boy; Tink accidentally gives her both a blue heart for a boy and a pink heart for a girl shortly before her birth, leading God to send him to Earth to retrieve a male heart. Sapphire has briefly been crowned to be Silverland's new king after her father's disappearance. But unfortunately, she is sentenced to the Coffin Tower after her mother the Queen and Duke Duralumin reveal her true gender identity. She also dons a couple disguises, a Zorro-style masked crime fighter known as the Phantom Knight and an unnamed maiden with a blond wig, for she has been in her multi-faceted relationship with Franz Charming, the actual prince from the neighboring kingdom of Goldland.

Island of Sodor
The Island of Sodor is a main setting in the book series The Railway Series by Rev. W. Awdry and Christopher Awdry, and its adaptations in other media.

Kingdom existed from 1099 to 1263.
Sigmund, the elected first king who reigned from 1099 to 1116.
The last king was Andreas, who died in the battle of Largs in 1263, along with his heir apparent, Peter.
Afterwards, the island became a Regency, and the last Regent, Sir Arnold de Normanby, was made Earl of Sodor by King Henry IV. The surname was later altered to Norramby. In 1753, the Earldom was extinguished by attainder; but in 1873, after popular petition, Queen Victoria graciously restored the title to the rightful pretender, John Arnold Norramby. The Earls were active on the Council of the Duchy of Lancaster, and, as there is no Duke of Lancaster, the Earls were popularly, albeit nominally, called Dukes of Sodor. They were:
John Arnold Norramby, 1st Duke of Sodor, reigned 1873 to 1894.
Henry John Norramby, 2nd Duke of Sodor, reigned 1894 to 1915.
Charles Henry Norramby, 3rd Duke of Sodor, reigned 1915 to 1941, and served in the First World War (also known as the Great War).
Robert Charles Norramby, 4th Duke of Sodor, reigned 1941 to 1943, killed in action in the Second World War.
Richard Robert Norramby, 5th Duke of Sodor, reigned since 1943, succeeded in his third year.

Both the 4th and 5th Dukes are mentioned in Duke the Lost Engine, while the 5th comes into Very Old Engines, where he opens the loop line of the Skarloey Railway.

Sol Empire
Princess Blaze the Cat serves as an independent, pyrokinetic monarch of the Sol Empire in her home dimension, in the Sonic the Hedgehog video game series and its IDW Publishing comic adaptations. She has the ability to create and manipulate fire in any way she pleases and is the appointed guardian of the seven Sol Emeralds in which she uses them to transform into "Burning Blaze". In Sonic the Hedgehog (2006), Blaze travels through time with Silver the Hedgehog. Her role is obviously similar to those of Sonic's and Knuckles the Echidna's.

Principality of Soleanna
The Principality of Soleanna (also known as the City of Water) is the sovereign island country in the video game, Sonic the Hedgehog (2006). It is inspired by Venice, Italy.

The Duke of Soleanna (voiced by David Wills)
The original ruler of the Principality of Soleanna, he happened to be a chief scientist who, during Shadow and Silver's time travel, led his technicians a research program called Solaris Project to manipulate time with the evil sun god Solaris for the betterment of mankind as well as resurrection of his wife the Duchess. But after the accident of the Solaris Project (which caused the entire castle to fall into disrepair), the Duke used a Chaos Emerald to seal Iblis, Solaris's raw power, within the soul of his daughter Elise right before he died, with Shadow sealing Mephiles the Dark, Solaris's conscious mind, inside the Scepter of Darkness.
Princess Elise III (voiced by Lacey Chabert)
The only daughter of the Duke and Duchess, she becomes a new ruler of the Principality of Soleanna, in spite of her young age, as she resides in the new castle following her father's death. However, Elise is a damsel in distress as she gets abducted by Doctor Eggman, who attempts to take Iblis out of her entire body to help conquer the world, but she gets rescued by Sonic the Hedgehog multiple times (see Princess and dragon). She is also assisted by her two ladies-in-waiting, Anna and Sophia.

Sto Lat and Sto Helit
Sto Lat and Sto Helit are featured in the Discworld series of novels by Terry Pratchett.

Olerve the Bastard, the King of Sto Lat assassinated on the orders of the Duke of Sto Helit in Mort.
Queen Kelirehenna I, originally Princess Keli, the daughter of Olerve the Bastard. In Mort, her assassination on the orders of the Duke of Sto Helit was meant to result in his ascension to the throne, the unification of Sto Lat and Sto Helit, the federation of the nations of the Sto Plains and a century of peace. However, after being saved by Mort, Death's human apprentice, she manages to ascend to throne after Death arranged for the timeline to be permanently altered.
Mortimer Sto Helit, former apprentice to Death, is invested as the Duke of Sto Helit by Queen Kelirehenna as a reward for saving her life, after the previous Duke died after his lifetimer was destroyed in a fight between Mort and Death. Mort marries Death's adoptive daughter Ysabell and adopts the family motto Non Temitis Messor (Don't Fear The Reaper). Both he and Ysabell die in a carriage crash in Soul Music after refusing Death's offer of immortality.
Susan Sto Helit has technically been the Duchess of Sto Helit since the death of her parents Mortimer and Ysabell Sto Helit in Soul Music but instead pursues a teaching career in Hogfather and Thief of Time and wishes to be referred to as "Miss Susan". She wishes simply to be normal despite having inherited many supernatural traits from her adoptive grandfather Death, such as the ability to walk through solid matter.

Stormhold
Stormhold is the magical kingdom in the novel Stardust by Neil Gaiman and its film adaptation.

The King of Stormhold, the 81st lord of Stormhold, and father of Lady Una, Lord Primus, Princes Secundus, Tertius, Quartus, Quintus and Sextus and Lord Septimus.
Lord Tristran Thorne, son of Dunstan Thorne and Lady Una, nephew of Lord Primus, Princes Secundus, Tertius, Quartus, Quintus and Sextus and Lord Septimus, and husband of Yvaine (daughter of the Moon).

Sun Kingdom
The Sun Kingdom is featured in the Japanese anime series The World Is Still Beautiful.

Sheila was a selected queen of the Sun Kingdom as the wife of the former King, although she was a commoner. She lived an isolated life in the castle with her son Livius, due to her low social status, until she passed away.
Livius Orvinus Ifrikia (Livius I) is the young king of the Sun Kingdom who begins his campaign to conquer the world after his mother's death, even though he is actually still a young boy.

Syldavia
Muskar XII is the king of the fictional Balkan country of Syldavia in the eighth volume of the Tintin comics. Another Syldavian kings mentioned in the same volume are, among others, Muskar I, the fictional first king, and Ottokar IV, whose scepter serves as the plot basis of it.

Sylvania
Queen Louise, the ruler of Sylvania in her own right who has been royally fed-up with her people's preoccupation with whom she would marry. She later marries Count Alfred Renard who, despite his qualms, promises to be her obedient consort, in the French play Le Prince Consort and its film adaptation The Love Parade.

T

Tangea
Tangea is featured in the animated television series, Buzz Lightyear of Star Command.

King Nova (voiced by John O'Hurley) is the alien monarch of Tangea. He is overprotective of his daughter Princess Mira Nova, the heir to the Tangean throne, and clearly disapproves of her choice of being a rookie Space Ranger. Therefore, King Nova has an estranged relationship with Mira as well as Captain Buzz Lightyear, although he still deeply cares about Mira as he helps out in bringing her out of a debilitating energy addiction.

Taronia
King Anatol XII (portrayed by Henry Stephenson) is the ruler of the Ruritanian kingdom of Taronia and the father of the ailing Princess Catterina in the film Thirty-Day Princess.

Terrasen
Aelin Galathynius is the Queen of Terrasen, and Faerie Queen of the West in the Throne of Glass novel series by Sarah J. Maas.

Themyscira
Shim'Tar Hippolyta is the Amazon queen of the island nation of Themyscira whose sister Antiope, the former queen, was a plotter of coup d'état in the DC Universe. She is the mother of Princess Diana (better known as Wonder Woman) and has been a member of the Justice Society of America. Hippolyta also travels to Man's World, assuming briefly the role of Wonder Woman in one story from Sensation Comics, although she mainly remains on the island.

Kingdom of Thornwood
The Kingdom of Thornwood is featured in the video game, Shining in the Darkness.

King Drake
He is the rightful ruler of the Kingdom of Thornwood who summons his loyal knight, Mortred, to escort his daughter Princess Jessa to the local shrine. But unfortunately, both Mortred and Jessa have disappeared, and the evil sorcerer Dark Sol appears to threaten Thornwood. Dark Sol plans to not return Jessa unless Drake hands his kingdom over to him, but Mortred's child defeats him and rescues Jessa (see Princess and dragon).

Torenth
Torenth is one of the Eleven Kingdoms in the series of Deryni novels by Katherine Kurtz and the main setting in King Kelson's Bride, ruled by the Houses of Furstán.

Wencit Furstán, the previous king of Torenth and the uncle of Alroy and Liam who reigned from 1110 to 1121.
Alroy Arion II Furstán d'Arjenol became the new ruler of Torenth following his uncle's death in 1121 but died under suspicious circumstances in 1123.
Liam Lajos II Lionel László Furstán d'Arjenol becomes a current king of Torenth with his mother, Princess Morag Furstána, and uncle, Duke Mahael, serving as his primary regents.

Trigan Empire
The Trigan Empire is a titular nation that is apparently modelled on Ancient Greece and the Roman Empire in The Rise and Fall of the Trigan Empire comic series by Mike Butterworth.

Emperor Trigo
Formerly the leader of the Vorg tribe, he is crowned as the founder of the Trigan Empire after his brother Brag allows him to become a sole ruler. Trigo had a vision of the Lokan Empire where the Vorg tribesmen would not be united, giving up their nomadic existence for they would soon become extinct. Instituting a treaty with the kingdom of Hericon, Trigo rises to sovereignty and faces many threats to his empire and himself following the attack between the nation of Tharv and the Lokan Empire, while his brother Klud tries to assassinate him. Trigo was married to Lady Ursa, the sister of King Kassar of Hericon, with whom he would have triplet sons, although two of them were later killed. He is also the uncle of Brag's son, Janno.

Tryphemia
King Pausole is the mythic monarch of Tryphemia in the novel The Adventures of King Pausole by Pierre Louÿs and its opérette adaptation.

Kingdom of Tycoon
The Kingdom of Tycoon is featured in the video game Final Fantasy V and its anime OVA adaptation Legend of the Crystals.

Alexander Highwind Tycoon
He was the widowed king of the Kingdom of Tycoon and the guardian of the Wind Crystal who traveled across the sea to kill Hiryu the dragon-like wind drake to extract medicine from its tongue for his ailing wife Queen Tycoon, but lost his biological daughter Princess Sarisa who was then found by the pirates. Unfortunately, the Queen passed away by the time the crystals began to shatter. When the wind currents began to slow and stale, King Alexander uses Hiryu's body to travel to the Wind Shrine, quelling the worries of his other daughter and heir Princess Lenna, before bearing witness to the Wind Crystal shattering and he suddenly disappeared afterward. It is later revealed that Alexander was controlled by the ancient sorcerer Exdeath in attempt to destroy the last of the four Crystals, before he reunited with both Lenna and Sarisa and then sacrificed himself to save Lenna and her allies, Bartz Klauser, King Galuf Baldesion and his granddaughter Princess Krile Baldesion. But his spirit, alongside the other spirits of the Warriors of Dawn, appeared to suppress Exdeath's control of the Void when he used it on the heroes at the Rift.
Lenna Charlotte "Reina" Tycoon
Formerly a princess, she becomes a reigning queen of the Kingdom of Tycoon, despite her young age, after her long-lost sister Sarisa Scherwil abandoned the throne to rejoin the pirates, following their father's death and Neo Exdeath's ultimate defeat. Sometime later, Queen Lenna, Bartz Klauser and the rest of the remaining heroes visit the Guardian Tree and solemnly vow to continue protecting the world and its four Crystals that are restored and reunified as peace returns.
Queen Lenna Tycoon
She is the new queen of the Kingdom of Tycoon in Final Fantasy: Legend of the Crystals. As a ruling queen, she has to make sure that the Wind Crystal is safe. But when her royal advisor Blue Mage warns her that the Crystals are going missing and the world is in danger again, Queen Lenna vows to protect the Wind Crystal as the last hope to restore order to the world. She sends the general of her kingdom's air force, Valkus, and the flag-airship Iron Wings to make sure the Crystal is safe. The Queen later tells the new heroes about Deathgyunos, the God of Oblivion, who would destroy the world if he is reborn by the evil wizard Ra Devil. She also sends Prettz and his friend Linally, Bartz's direct descendant, to find the Dragon which can transport them to the Black Moon where they would combat Ra Devil. In the end, Lenna restores the recovered Crystals to their rightful places.

U

Udrogoth
Udrogoth is featured in the Disney Channel animated series, Dave the Barbarian.

King Throktar and Queen Glimia (voiced by Kevin Michael Richardson and Erica Luttrell) are the proper rulers of Udrogoth and the parents of Prince Dave and Princesses Candy and Fang. They are away fighting evil across the world, although they can communicate to their children via the crystal ball of Glimia's brother Oswidge the "sorcerer", which seems to operate like a telephone.
Princess Candace "Candy" Barbarian (also voiced by Erica Luttrell), the eldest of Throktar and Glimia, is left in charge as a princess regent of Udrogoth while her parents are away but has a contemporary "valley girl" attitude; she would rather go shopping and hang out than rule her kingdom. However, Candy has to protect the kingdom from evil with her martial arts skills, alongside her muscular brother Dave and younger sister Fang.

The Underground
King Asgore Dreemurr of the Underground, the king of all monsters, ex-Husband of Toriel and the father of the primary antagonist, Prince Asriel Dreemurr (aka Flowey), in the video game Undertale. He is a benevolent, goat-like monster with a golden beard and white fur and speaks with a Southern accent.

Underland
The Lady of the Green Kirtle is an evil Northern Witch who reigns as the queen of Underland in The Chronicles of Narnia novel series by C. S. Lewis. She is the main antagonist in The Silver Chair, in which she kidnaps Prince Rilian and enslaves him by her witchcraft to conquer Narnia until she has been foiled by Eustace Scrubb, Jill Pole and Puddleglum.

The Underworld
Multiple fictional works feature the mythical realm of the Underworld as being led by the monarch.

Pan's Labyrinth
An unnamed and also benevolent King of the Underworld is the father of Princess Moanna (aka Ofelia), the child protagonist in the Spanish film Pan's Labyrinth.

Star vs. the Forces of Evil
Queen Wrathmelior Lucitor is a giant demon queen who rules the Underworld with her Mewman husband King Dave in the Disney XD animated series, Star vs. the Forces of Evil. She is the mother of Crown Prince Tom Lucitor.

Unikingdom
The Unikingdom is a main setting in the animated television series, Unikitty!

Princess Unikitty is the ruler of the Unikingdom who deals with the threats of the evil Master Frown and goes on the misadventures with her brother Prince Puppycorn, Dr. Fox the scientist, Hawkodile the bodyguard, and Richard the royal advisor.

Urado Kingdom
The Urado Kingdom is part of the fictional continent of Rumeliana in the Japanese anime series, Altair: A Record of Battles. It is based on Wallachia and Hungary.

King Zsigmond III
He is the polite and honorable, but also strict and stoic, sovereign of the Urado Kingdom who tries his best to follow the kingdom's isolationist traditions, in spite of the fact that Urado grew very impoverished during his reign. Zsigmond is persuaded by Tuğril Mahmut Pasha to ally with the Türkiye Stratocracy, although he nearly makes a treaty with the Balt-Rhein Empire, recognizing his kingdom's dire situation and weakened state. He is the father of Princesses Gertrude and Margit.

Urland
Urland is a post-Roman kingdom in the film, Dragonslayer.

King Casiodorus (portrayed by Peter Eyre), the ruler of Urland who consequently sends the wizard's apprentice, Galen Bradwarden, with a magical amulet to rescue his daughter Princess Elspeth from a 400-year-old dragon, Vermithrax Pejorative (see Princess and dragon). Casiodorus then claims that he has killed the dragon, when in truth, it was actually killed by Galen who sacrifices himself for this purpose.

V

Empire of Valua
The Empire of Valua is the main antagonist of the video game, Skies of Arcadia.

Empress Teodora
The corrupt tyrant whose Empire of Valua seeks the six powerful Moon Crystals to reawaken the colossal living weapons of destruction, called the Gigas, and conquer the world. She directs the Valuan Armada, a fleet of warships commanded by Lord Galcian and Vice-Captain Ramirez, to find the crystals. But in the end, after finally retrieving the Moon Crystals, Galcian and Ramirez call the Rains of Destruction down upon Valua, killing Teodora and seizing the control of the Valuan Armada in a bid to dominate the world.
Prince Enrique
He becomes the new emperor of the Empire of Valua after his villainous mother Teodora dies from the lack of concern during the Rains of Destruction. He has no influence over his government's tyranny and has thus joined in with Vyse and his crew members of the air pirates, called the Blue Rogues, after helping them escape the empire's grand fortress by stealing the Delphinus airship. And after defeating the Valuan Armada to end the Rains of Destruction, Enrique marries Princess Moegi of Yafutoma to be his empress and, with a promise of benevolent reign, oversees the reconstruction of his empire's capital.

Vers Empire
The Vers Empire is a nation that rules the planet Mars in the Japanese anime series, Aldnoah.Zero.

Rayregalia Vers Rayvers
He was the first emperor and the scientist who founded the Vers Empire in 1972 when he declared Mars's independence from the planet Earth after being recognized as a rightful master by the Aldnoah technology that had burned its activation processes into his genes, giving him supreme authority over them. Utilizing Aldnoah's power monopoly, Rayregalia based his empire's authority on the military force and created a class of warlords who swore fealty to him and soon became the Martian Knights. In 1997, he abdicated the throne due to health problem. However in 1999, when his son and heir Gilzeria was killed in action, Rayregalia was forced to return to the throne.
Gilzeria Vers
He became the second emperor of the Vers Empire following his father's retirement in 1997. Rayregalia's illness allowed him to ascend the throne and used his people's jealousy of Earth to maintain order on the empire. Emperor Gilzeria only reigned the Vers Empire for two years until his tragic death when he whipped the Orbital Knights into a frenzy and sent them against Earth, causing the conflict spurring Heaven Fall during the First Earth-Mars War. He was killed in the war at that time, leading his father to reclaim the throne and become the guardian of his two daughters Princesses Asseylum and Lemrina.
Asseylum Vers Allusia
Formerly a princess, she becomes the empress of the Vers Empire after the deaths of her father Gilzeria and grandfather Rayregalia. Her younger half-sister Lemrina Vers Envers and close friend Slaine Troyard have been waging the Second Earth-Mars War against the planet Earth in her name, and she herself eventually regains control of her empire. Her goal is to make peace with Earth by separating the imperial military from Slaine's forces, in which he has allied by using Princess Lemrina in disguise to claim the position for himself and exposing his treachery. Asseylum has been a love interest to Inaho Kaizuka but has been betrothed to Count Klancain, who has saved her from assassins and shares her desire for peace, to help her cement her position as the ruling empress.

Videoland
Videoland is featured in the animated/live-action television series, Captain N: The Game Master. It is inhabited by the video game characters, mainly the ones from Nintendo.

King Charles Oberonn (voiced by Long John Baldry) is the original sovereign of Videoland who has been banished to the Mirror World by the evil Mother Brain. He is the father of Princess Lana and Prince Lyle.
Princess Lana (voiced by Venus Terzo) becomes the regent of Videoland when her father is banished. She has been trained to defend herself from a young age and is able to keep up with the other members of the N-Team, led by Kevin Keene, throughout their adventures.

Vigoor Empire
The Vigoor Empire is a landlocked Western Asian nation in the Ninja Gaiden video game series.

The Holy Vigoor Emperor
An unnamed emperor was the villainous immortal figurehead and the representation of the evil deity Vigoor, whose imperialistic empire had a modern military with a black ops division, ready to make any dissidents disappear in the night. In Ninja Gaiden (2004), the Emperor sent the Greater Fiend Doku with his army of samurai warriors to retrieve the Dark Dragon Blade sword by raiding the Hayabusa Village and massacring most of its villagers, leaving Ryu Hayabusa, the lone survivor of his village, bent on revenge. The Vigoor Emperor was then in possession of the Dark Dragon Blade as he eagerly ordered his army and black ops to try eliminating Ryu who was fighting his way in the empire's capital, Tairon. However, after rescuing Rachel from Doku, Ryu entered the realm and killed the Emperor to reclaim the Dark Dragon Blade. In Ninja Gaiden: Dragon Sword, the Vigoor Emperor was resurrected in his deity form by ancient goddesses Ishtaros and Nicchae with the power of the Dark Dragonstones. But the Dark Dragon himself began to manifest and encased Ishtaros in a cocoon, thus destroying the symbolic Emperor before he could resurrect the Fiends completely.

Vulgaria
Baron and Baroness Bomburst (portrayed by Gert Fröbe and Anna Quayle), the villainous tyrants of Vulgaria who claim that all children are illegal in their country as they send out the Child Catcher to abduct and imprison each of every kids, including Jeremy and Jemima Potts, in the film Chitty Chitty Bang Bang.

W

Wakanda
T'Chaka was the King of Wakanda and the original Black Panther in the Marvel Universe.
T'Challa, son of King T'Chaka and former prince, becomes the new King of Wakanda and also the Black Panther.
Shuri, princess of Wakanda and T'Challa's sister who becomes the new Black Panther after her brother's death as well as a new queen.

Westeros
Westeros is a fictional continent within the world of the novel series A Song of Ice and Fire by George R. R. Martin and its television adaptation Game of Thrones. Most of the continent consists of a realm known as the Seven Kingdoms. The sovereign who rules the Seven Kingdoms is given the title "King of the Andals, the Rhoynar and the First Men, Lord of the Seven Kingdoms and Protector of the Realm."

Targaryen Dynasty
Aegon I Targaryen (Aegon the Conqueror)
Conquered Six of the Seven independent Kingdoms of Westeros.
Aenys I Targaryen
Firstborn son of King Aegon I, heir to the Iron Throne.
Maegor I Targaryen (Maegor the Cruel)
Second-born son of King Aegon I, usurped the Iron Throne from his nephew and legal heir, Prince Aegon. (son of Aenys I)
Jaehaerys I Targaryen (Jaehaerys the Conciliator)
Third-born son of King Aenys I, legally usurped the Iron Throne from his uncle, King Maegor I.
Viserys I Targaryen (The Young King)
Grandson of King Jaehaerys I.
Aegon II Targaryen
Firstborn son of King Viserys I. Usurped the Iron Throne from the legal heir and his sister, Princess Rhaenyra, firstborn daughter of King Viserys I.
Aegon III Targaryen
Grandson of King Jaehaerys I.
Daeron I Targaryen
Firstborn son of King Aegon III.
Baelor I Targaryen (Baelor the Blessed)
Second-born son of King Aegon III, brother to King Daeron I.
Viserys II Targaryen
Grandson of King Viserys I, brother to King Aegon III, uncle to King Baelor I.
Aegon IV Targaryen
Firstborn son of King Viserys II.
Daeron II Targaryen
Firstborn son of King Aegon IV.
Aerys I Targaryen
Maekar I Targaryen
Aegon V Targaryen
Jaehaerys II Targaryen
Aerys II Targaryen
Viserys III Targaryen (the Beggar King), pretender
Second-born son of King Aerys II Targaryen, and brother to Prince Rhaegar Targaryen.
Daenerys I Targaryen, pretender
Younger sister of Rhaegar and Viserys, becomes heiress of the Iron Throne after her husband Khal Drogo murders Viserys.
Aegon VI Targaryen (Young Griff), pretender
Alleged son of Prince Rhaegar Targaryen and Elia Martell (it was supposed that both mother and son had been murdered by Gregor Clegane).

Baratheon Dynasty
Robert I Baratheon
Crowned King after his first cousin once removed, King Aerys II Targaryen, was killed during Robert's Rebellion
Joffrey I Baratheon
Known to the Seven Kingdoms as the eldest son of King Robert I. Actually a bastard born of incest between Robert's wife, Cersei Lannister, and her brother Jaime Lannister.
Tommen I Baratheon
Younger brother to King Joffrey I, also a bastard born of his mother and uncle's incestuous relationship.

The current monarch of the Seven Kingdoms is King Tommen I Baratheon.

Television Show

Cersei I of the House Lannister
 Robert Baratheon's widow, and mother of Joffrey and Tommen, self-proclaimed Queen after her younger son's suicide.
Brandon I of the House Stark
 Elected King by the assembled Lords Paramount of the Seven Kingdoms after the death of both Queens Cersei and Daenerys.

Westfalin
Westfalin is featured in Princess of the Midnight Ball, a fairy tale retelling of "The Twelve Dancing Princesses" by Jessica Day George.

 King Gregor
 Crown Princess Rose
 Crown Prince Galen
 Princess Lily
 Princess Jonquil
 Princess Hyacinth
 Princess Violet
 Princess Daisy
 Princess Poppy
 Princess Iris
 Princess Lilac
 Princess Orchid
 Princess Pansy
 Princess Petunia

Westmark
Westmark is the titular French kingdom in the novel trilogy of the same name by Lloyd Alexander.

King Augustine IV was the previous ruler of Westmark who has slipped into dementia, illness and depression due to the disappearance of his long-lost daughter Augusta and whose power has been abused by his chief minister Cabbarus.
Princess Augusta (aka Mickle) becomes a reigning queen of Westmark after her father's death, with Theo as her prince consort, in the third novel The Beggar Queen.

Windemere
Windemere is a modern European kingdom in the animated film Barbie in Princess Power, ruled by the Thornton family.

King Kristoff and Queen Karina Thornton (voiced by Michael Adamthwaite and Patricia Drake)
They are the rulers of Windemere and the parents of Princesses Kara, Zooey, and Gabby Thornton. They are caring, but overprotective of their daughters and disagree with Kara's wild behavior. They are first shown worried after seeing Kara crash into a tree after she fails to pilot a flying device her friends Madison and Makayla create for her. Kristoff and Karina are then even more angry when they find out she is the superheroine Super Sparkle. However, they later support Kara after she rescues them and her sisters from the evil Baron von Ravendale.
Princess Kara Thornton/Super Sparkle (voiced by Kelly Sheridan)
The heir apparent of Windemere, Kara has a need for speed and is often reckless because of it. After being kissed by a magical butterfly, she becomes Super Sparkle and goes out saving her kingdom (or just bringing criminals like thieves to justice). She and her cousin Princess Corinne (aka Dark Sparkle) team up to stop Baron von Ravendale from committing a coup and killing her family.

Winkie Country
The Winkie Country is a major setting in the Oz novel series by L. Frank Baum and its adaptations in other media.

The Tin Woodman
He has been repaired by the Winkie Tinsmiths, due to being torn into pieces by the winged monkeys, and then asked by the rest of the Winkies to become their new monarch after Dorothy Gale defeats the Wicked Witch of the West, who was the original ruler of the Winkie Country, by melting her with a bucket of water. The Tin Man is thus placed as the emperor of the Winkie Country and resides in his Tin Palace as he moves from the Wicked Witch of the West's castle because it was too damp.

Kingdom of Wisdom
The Kingdom of Wisdom is a parallel country beyond a titular tollbooth in the novel The Phantom Tollbooth by Norton Juster and its live-action/animated film adaptation.

King Azaz the Unabridged
He is one of the two rulers of the Kingdom of Wisdom who resides in the city of Dictionopolis. His law is that words are more important than numbers, so he banishes his sisters Princesses Rhyme and Reason to the Castle in the Air from not seeing eye to eye with their decision with letters and numbers being equal. However, when the kingdom becomes disastrous, Azaz sends Milo, Tock the "watchdog" and the Humbug to rescue the princesses and restore peace.
The Mathemagician
He is King Azaz's brother and the other ruler of the Kingdom of Wisdom who resides in the city of Digitopolis. The Mathemagician also banishes his sisters Rhyme and Reason to the Castle in the Air from not seeing eye to eye with their decision with numbers and letters being equal, for his law is that numbers are far more important than words.

Witchland
Gorice XI, the King of Witchland in the novel The Worm Ouroboros by E. R. Eddison.
Gorice XII, the successor and reincarnation of Gorice XI.

Wolfkrone
Wolfkrone is a fictional German kingdom within the Holy Roman Empire in the video game, Soulcalibur IV.

King George von Krone was the former monarch whose kingdom of Wolfkrone was under assault by the forces of the evil Nightmare. He lost his sanity to the destructive rains of the Evil Seed, which drove him insane into a Malfested. George then disappeared without a trace and has not been seen since. However, he would return and arrived on the battle but not before being stabbed with a dagger, leaving his daughter Hilde no choice but to kill him.
Princess Hildegard "Hilde" von Krone is forced to ascend the throne as, despite her young age, the new monarch of Wolfkrone after her father King George fell into madness. She takes the responsibilities to protect her kingdom and is able to resist Nightmare's invading forces by gathering her armies in the front lines.

Wonderland
The Queen of Hearts is the villainous, foul-tempered monarch of Wonderland who rules alongside the King of Hearts, in the novel Alice's Adventures in Wonderland by Lewis Caroll and its adaptations in other media.

X

Xanth
Xanth is a titular fantasy realm in the novel series of the same name by Piers Anthony. Here, the Kings of Xanth possess their magical talents among other humans, strong enough for them to be classified as Magicians. The female monarch also holds the title of "king", rather than "queen".

Merlin, the first king of Xanth and the Magician of Knowledge who reigned from 204 until his abdication in 226.
Roogna, the second king of Xanth via marriage to Merlin's daughter Taplin, who reigned from 228 to 286. He built the castle in which was named for him and became the home of the monarchs of Xanth.
Rana, the third king and first female king of Xanth and the Magician of Creation, reigned from 286 to 325.
Reitas, the fourth king of Xanth and the Magician of Problem Solving, reigned from 325 to 350.
Rune, the fifth king of Xanth, the son of Rana, and the Magician of Evocation who reigned from 350 to 378.
Jonathan, the sixth king of Xanth, the son of Merlin, and the Magician of Zombie Master who re-animated the dead, reigned from 378 to 478.
Vortex, the seventh king of Xanth and the Magician of Demon Summoning, reigned from 478 to 548.
Neytron, the eighth king of Xanth and the Magician who Brings Paintings to Life, reigned from 548 to 575.
Nero, the ninth king of Xanth and the Magician who Brings Golems to Life, reigned from 575 to 623.
Gromden, the tenth king of Xanth, reigned from 623, who was able to divine the history of any object he touched.
Yin-Yang, the eleventh king of Xanth, reigned from 677, who was able to create invokable spells. Yin was his good self who created good spells, and Yang was his bad self who created evil spells.
Muerte A. Fid, the twelfth king of Xanth, reigned from 719, whose talent was alchemy. He murdered King Yin-Yang and his son Lord Bliss and intended to force Yin-Yang's granddaughter Rose to marry him.
Quan, the thirteenth king of Xanth, the nephew of Muerte, and the Magician of Herbalism, reigned from 753 to 797.
Elona, the fourteenth king and second female king of Xanth and the Magician of Longevity, reigned from 797 to 866.
Warren, the fifteenth king of Xanth, reigned from 866, who is a ghost after being murdered by Muerte.
Ebnez, the sixteenth king of Xanth, reigned from 909, who was able to adapt magical inanimate items and was married to Mnem to have nine daughters the Muses of Mountain Parnassus.
Good Magician Humfrey, the seventeenth king of Xanth and the gnome-like Magician of Information, reigned from 952 to 971.
Aeolus, the eighteenth king of Xanth and the Magician of Storms who reigned from 971 after Humfrey's abdication.
Magician Trent, the nineteenth king of Xanth and the Magician of Transformation who reigned from 1042 after Aeolus's death. He is married to Queen Iris, Sorceress of Illusion, with whom he has two daughters Irene and Ilene.
Irene, the Sorceress of Plants and former princess who becomes the twentieth king and third female king of Xanth when her parents Trent and Iris move to the North Village. She is married to Magician Dor, with whom she has three children Princesses Ivy and Ida and Prince Dolph.

Y

Yangdon
Yangdon is featured in the Philippine television series, Princess and I. It is based on the Kingdom of Bhutan.

Maja Raja Wangchuk (portrayed by Dante Rivero) was the previous King of the kingdom of Yangdon, seen in the first episode "A Princess is Born".
Anand Wangchuk (portrayed by Albert Martinez), the son of the late Maja Raja, is the current King of Yangdon and the biological father of the series' protagonist, Mikay Maghirang.

Ylisse
Ylisse is part of the fictional continent of Archanea in the video game Fire Emblem Awakening.

Queen Emmeryn is a kind monarch of Ylisse who is the Exalt for most of the war against the kingdom of Plegia led by its merciless ruler King Gangrel. She desires peaceful relations between her kingdom and Plegia and is a sage who possesses the Brand of Naga. Emmeryn is the elder sister of Prince Chrom and Princess Lissa, the future aunt of Princess Lucina and Prince Owain, and the descendant of the Hero-King Marth of Altea.

Yul
Hong Gildong, the Robin Hood-like noble thief who overthrows the previous King to become the ruler of Yul as its new king under his benevolent government in the novel Hong Gildong jeon.

Z

Zambezi
King Mulambon (portrayed by Rudolph Walker) is the African monarch whose kingdom of Zambezi becomes a trade partner with the United Kingdom, in the film King Ralph. He and King Ralph share their concerns about the role of their leadership as well as the economic interests of their nations.

Zamunda
Jaffe Joffer (portrayed by James Earl Jones) was the King of an African nation of Zamunda in the first film Coming to America.
Akeem Joffer (portrayed by Eddie Murphy), formerly the crown prince, becomes the new King of Zamunda with Lisa McDowell as his Queen, following Jaffe's death, in the film sequel Coming 2 America.

Zenobia
The kingdom of Zenobia is featured in the video game, Ogre Battle: The March of the Black Queen.

King Gran Zenobia was the previous monarch of Zenobia who united the other kingdoms in the continent of Zetegenia and invaded Hyland once ruled by Empress Endora, who revealed to him the invasion plans of the Holy Lodissian Empire, but he has been assassinated by Endora's son Prince Gares during the war. He was the father of Princes Tristan and Jan Zenobia and the husband of the widowed Queen Floran Zenobia. 
Pheryx Tristan Zenobia, the former prince and rightful heir, becomes the new king of Zenobia under the alias "Saint King Tristan" after the war and his father's death, with Rauny Vinzalf as his queen, as he unites both his kingdom and Hyland under one called the Kingdom of New Zenobia, although his younger brother Prince Jan was killed during the attack along with his father.

Zephyr Heights
Queen Haven (voiced by Jane Krakowski), the reigning Pegasus queen of Zephyr Heights who thinks that, with the use of wires, only the royal pegasi can fly and not her subjects, and that the power of flight may not be worth disturbing that, until she later discovers the truth about the royals' flight in the Netflix animated film My Little Pony: A New Generation. She is the mother of Princesses Zipp Storm and Pipp Petals.

Zofia
Zofia is part of the fictional continent of Valentia in the video game, Fire Emblem Gaiden, and its remake, Echoes: Shadows of Valentia.

King Lima IV was the hedonistic and ambitious ruler of Zofia who took Liprica, the former priestess to Mila the Earth Mother, away from the grounds of the Temple of Mila and obligated her to marry him, making her the queen of Zofia. His selfishness and infamous reign had led both his kingdom and the Rigelian Empire into war in and out of the country. In Shadows of Valentia, Lima has a son, Prince Conrad (aka the Masked Knight), who has been vanished after the rest of his children were killed by the fire.
Anthiese Lima (aka Celica), the sole surviving exiled princess, unites Zofia and Rigel into the One Kingdom of Valentia, becoming its founding queen under the marriage of her former foster brother Prince Alm, following the reunion with her older half-brother Conrad.

Zoravia
Zoravia is featured in the animated television series, Princess Natasha. 

King Carl and Queen Lena
They are the rightful rulers of Zoravia who Carl's older brother Lubek plots to overthrow them after being ousted by launching a series of attacks on their kingdom from the United States. Carl and Lena alert their daughter Princess Natasha of anything that is going on in Zoravia and reluctantly allow her to travel to the U.S., where she soon lives with the O'Brien family and attends school as a normal girl, in order to cease those attacks and stop Lubek's evil plans.

Zymot
Zymot is featured in the Japanese anime series, Kiba.

King Hugh
He is the head of the Zymot Usurpers who at an earlier age served as the primary retainer under the King of Zymot. However, when the King placed his half Key Spirit into his daughter Princess Rebecca's forehead, Hugh had started to attempt killing him and capturing Rebecca. He uses Dumas Schuramux as a spy, manipulating him in believing he is becoming the next king by marrying Princess Rebecca. Soon after the King releases the shard from Rebecca's forehead, Hugh kills him and casts Rebecca away, free to do whatever she wishes. After that, Hugh becomes the new king of Zymot and lusts to obtain every Key Spirit he can get his hands on. He eventually begins to invade the ruling country of Neotopia with an army of Tusk beastmen. But in the end, savior Zed hits Hugh with a shard explosive and then stabs him through the torso.

Unknown countries

Barbie and the Magic of Pegasus
The unnamed King and Queen (voiced by Russell Roberts and Kathleen Barr) are the rulers of the northern Dutch kingdom who are so overprotective to their younger daughter Princess Annika that they are unable to tell her the truth about her older sister Princess Brietta, who now resides in the Cloud Kingdom, being turned into a Pegasus by the evil sorcerer Wenlock. The King and Queen are then turned into stones, along with their subjects, after Annika refuses to marry Wenlock until they eventually changed back by her magical build-up Wand of Light in the animated film, Barbie and the Magic of Pegasus.

Barbie as the Princess and the Pauper
Queen Genevieve (voiced by Ellen Kennedy) is a dowager of her kingdom who has been forced to marry her villainous royal advisor Preminger, whom the kingdom has been bankrupt. She betroths her daughter Princess Anneliese to the wealthy King Dominick of Dulcinea to save her kingdom from bankruptcy. Anneliese, however, is engaged to her former tutor Julian as King Dominick makes a pauper girl, Erika, his queen consort in the animated film Barbie as the Princess and the Pauper.

Barbie in the 12 Dancing Princesses
King Randolph (voiced by Christopher Gaze) is a widowed monarch in the animated film Barbie in the 12 Dancing Princesses, whose wife Queen Isabella had died from giving birth to their twelve daughters, much to his devastation. Determined to drift the twelve princesses away from their unladylike hobbies and interests, such as dancing, he summons his cousin Duchess Rowena to help educate them into proper ladies. Unbeknownst to him, Rowena seeks to steal his throne by poisoning him and getting rid of all his daughters. But the twelve princesses backfire on Rowena by making her dancing uncontrollably. A group of the twelve dancing princesses includes:

Princess Ashlyn (voiced by Nicole Oliver)
Princess Blair (voiced by Jennifer Copping)
Princess Courtney (voiced by Lalainia Lindbjerg)
Princess Delia (voiced by Kathleen Barr)
Princess Edeline (voiced by Chiara Zanni)
Princess Fallon (voiced by Adrienne Carter)
Princess Genevieve (voiced by Kelly Sheridan)
Princess Hadley (voiced by Ashleigh Ball)
Princess Isla (also voiced by Ashleigh Ball)
Princess Janessa (voiced by Britt McKillip)
Princess Kathleen (voiced by Maddy Capozzi)
Princess Lacey (voiced by Chantal Strand)

Cinderella
The King is an old, lonely monarch who longs to have his own grandchildren before he would pass away. Aided by his assistant and advisor the Grand Duke, the King puts up the royal ball for his son the Prince Charming to be engaged to one of every eligible maiden in his kingdom, which turns out to be the title character in Disney's Cinderella franchise. In the live-action remake, the old King passes away, leaving his son the Prince to ascend the throne alongside Cinderella.

Gate: Thus the Japanese Self-Defense Force Fought in Their Land
In the Japanese anime series, Gate, the unnamed Empire is the antagonistic country within the Special Region. It is inspired by the ancient Roman Empire.

Molt Sol Augustus
He is the ruthlessly pragmatical emperor of the Empire who is initially reluctant to seek peace with the Japanese Self-Defense Forces, fearing that they might be truly unstoppable should he give them time to establish foothold. However, after being rescued from the clutches of his disowned son Prince Zorzal, Molt allies himself with the JSDF and appoints his daughter Princess Piña as his rightful heir.
Zorzal El Caesar
He is the crown prince of the Empire, and the older half-brother of Princess Piña and Prince Diabo, who swears revenge on JSDF soldier Yōji Itami for freeing his prisoner Noriko Mochizuki from his sexual slavery. Zorzal dethrones his father Molt to install himself as the new emperor and attempts to wage his suicidal war against Japan, heedless of the JSDF's technological superiority.
Piña Co Lada
She is the rightful heir to the imperial throne, and the leader of the Rose-Order of Knights, who is appointed crown princess by her father Emperor Molt after being rescued from Zorzal's clutches. She wishes to establish peace with Japan, knowing that a war with the JSDF would eventually lead to the Empire's destruction. In the end, after drifting Zorzal and his supporters from the imperial capital called Sadera, Piña becomes the new empress of the Empire. Her name is oddly derived from the rum-based cocktail piña colada.

Sleeping Beauty
Here are the monarchs of the unnamed kingdoms in Disney's Sleeping Beauty franchise.

King Stefan
The ruler of the kingdom whose daughter Princess Aurora has been cursed by the evil fairy Maleficent to have her finger pricked on the pointy spindle of a spinning wheel, causing her to sleep. Although Stefan orders spinning wheels in his kingdom to be burned to prevent the curse from happening, he and his wife Queen Leah have been told by the Three Good Fairies, Flora, Fauna and Merryweather, that they had to raise Aurora away in the forest to protect her. In the live-action remake Maleficent, Stefan is a cruel and corrupted monarch who is shown as to have had quite a history with Maleficent, making her a victimized villain.
King Hubert
The monarch of the neighboring kingdom who is a friend to King Stefan, with whom he betroths his son and heir Prince Phillip to the newly born Princess Aurora. In Maleficent: Mistress of Evil, he is known as King John, ruler of Ulstead, whose wife Queen Ingrith secretly plans to overthrow him by placing a curse on him to sleep. But Maleficent breaks the curse, awakening the king as Phillip ends the war between his kingdom and all the fairies.

See also
List of fictional monarchs of real countries
List of fictional nobility
List of fictional prime ministers of the United Kingdom
List of fictional politicians
List of fictional political parties
Lists of fictional presidents of the United States
List of fictional princes
List of fictional princesses

References

monarchs
fictional monarchs